This article provides lists of famous and notable Bengali people in the South Asian subcontinent, mainly what is today Bangladesh, Pakistan and India, and people with Bengali ancestry or people who speak Bengali as their primary language.

Monarchs

Pala Dynasty
Chronological order

Chandra Dynasty
 Traillokyachandra (900–930)
 Srichandra (930–975)
 Kalyanachandra (975–1000)
 Ladahachandra (1000–1020)
 Govindachandra (1020–1050)

Deva Dynasty
 Dasharathadeva (1281)
 Pratapaditya, Maharaja of Jessore (1561–1611)
 Kirtinarayan Basu, Raja of Chandradwip (from 1668), converted to Islam

Ilyas Shahi dynasty (1352–1414)

House of Ganesha
 Raja Ganesha
 Jalaluddin Muhammad Shah
 Shamsuddin Ahmad Shah (1419–1436)

Hussain Shahi dynasty (1494–1538)

Other

 Paragal Khan, 16th-century governor of Chittagong
 Chhuti Khan, 16th-century governor of Chittagong
 Shahzada Danyal, son of Alauddin Husain Shah
 Syeda Momena Khatun, daughter of Ghiyasuddin Mahmud Shah
 Isa Khan (1529–1599), leader of the Baro-Bhuiyan chieftains of Bengal
 Musa Khan (d. 1623), leader of the Baro-Bhuiyan chieftains of Bengal
 Dilal Khan (1585–1666), final independent ruler of Sandwip
 Kirtinarayan Basu (r. 1668–?), fifth Raja of Chandradwip and founder of the Muslim Baklai family
 Chowdhury Abu Torab Khan (d. 1767), zamindar of Sandwip and leader of Bengal's first anti-colonial uprising
 Titumir (1782–1831), anti-colonial rebel and self-proclaimed Badshah
 Rahimullah (d. 1861), Chief of Baraikhali and leader of the Sundarbans Indigo Revolt
 Golam Ali Chowdhury (1824–1888), zamindar of Haturia and philanthropist

Nobel laureates

 Rabindranath Tagore, Nobel Prize in Literature, First Nobel Prize winner of Asia, 1913
 Amartya Sen, Nobel Memorial Prize in Economic Sciences, 1998
 Muhammad Yunus, Nobel Peace Prize, 2006
 Abhijit Banerjee, Nobel Prize in Economic science, 2019

Academics

 Momtazuddin Ahmed, philosopher and educationist
 Dewan Mohammad Azraf, National Professor of Bangladesh
 Sanghamitra Bandyopadhyay, first women Director of Indian Statistical Institute, India
 Chandramukhi Basu, computer scientist and first female graduate in India, and the British Empire
 Nurunnahar Fatema Begum, head of paediatric cardiology at the Combined Medical Hospital (Dhaka)
 Anudvaipayan Bhattacharya, university lecturer martyred in the Bangladesh Liberation War
 Jatindramohan Bhattacharya, academic and literary researcher
 Padmanath Bhattacharya, academic and literary researcher
 Mahamahopadhyay Pandit Mahesh Chandra Nyayratna Bhattacharyya
 Sugata Bose, historian
 Dipesh Chakrabarty, historian
 Sudhir Chakraborty, researcher of Bengal's folk culture
 Swapan Kumar Chakravorty, literary scholar and writer
 Partha Chatterjee, political scientist
 Suniti Kumar Chatterjee, linguist, educationist, litterateur
 Sukanta Chaudhuri, literary scholar, writer, translator
 Supriya Chaudhuri, literary scholar, writer, translator
 Jamilur Reza Choudhury, vice-chancellor of University of Asia Pacific, adviser to Caretaker Government of Bangladesh
 Sadruddin Ahmed Chowdhury, physicist and vice-chancellor of Shahjalal University of Science and Technology and Sylhet International University
 Khudiram Das, literary scholar, educationist, linguist
 Satish Ranjan Das, founder of The Doon School, Dehradun
 Shomie Das, Indian educationist, former headmaster of The Doon School
 Tarak Chandra Das, anthropologist, author, former teacher in anthropology, University of Calcutta 
 Bhupendranath Datta, revolutionary, author, anthropologist
 Soumitra Dutta, Dean Elect of Saïd Business School at University of Oxford and former Founding Dean of Samuel Curtis Johnson Graduate School of Management at Cornell University 
 Anil Kumar Gain, mathematician from University of Cambridge, Fellow of the Royal Statistical Society
 Kaberi Gain, prominent academic, author, and social activist
 Swapan K. Gayen, Bengali-American physicist, professor at City University of New York
 Saroj Ghose, science populariser and museum maker, won an award for Best Effort in Science Popularisation Amongst Children
 Subir Kumar Ghosh, planetary scientist and a winner of the Shanti Swarup Bhatnagar Prize for Science and Technology
 Joseph Ghosh, first Indian to be awarded the Doctor of Letters, University of Edinburgh
 Aminul Hoque MBE, lecturer at Goldsmiths, University of London, writer
 K M Baharul Islam, Dean of the Indian Institute of Management Kashipur
 Syed Manzoorul Islam, critic, writer, former professor of Dhaka University
 Mohammad Ataul Karim, Provost and Executive Vice Chancellor of the University of Massachusetts Dartmouth
 Ataur Rahman Khan Khadim, physician martyred during the Bangladesh Liberation War
 Salman Khan, American educator, founder of Khan Academy
 Nazia Khanum, Order of the British Empire (OBE) and Deputy Lieutenant (DL)
 Shahla Khatun, obstetrician and gynecologist
 Brigadier Abdul Malik, founder of National Heart Foundation
 Prasanta Chandra Mahalanobis, statistician, founder of Indian Statistical Institute
 Vina Mazumdar, academic, activist and feminist
 Ujjwal Maulik, computer scientist and former Head, Computer Science and Engineering, Jadavpur University
 Rajendralal Mitra, first modern Indologist of Indian origin
 Nurul Momen, professor of law, Dhaka University Proctor, Dean
 Satish Chandra Mukherjee, educationist
 Abdul Muktadir, academician martyred in the Bangladesh Liberation War
 Nurul Islam Nahid, former Education Minister of Bangladesh
 Ashis Nandy, political psychologist
 M. A. Rashid, first Vice-chancellor of Bangladesh University of Engineering and Technology
 Satyajit Ray, first Indian to win a Lifetime Achievement Oscar due to his significant contributions to world cinema
 Abul Kashem Sandwip, educationist and a founder of Bangladesh Betar
 Sir Jadunath Sarkar, historian
 Maqbular Rahman Sarkar, tenth vice-chancellor of Rajshahi University
 Abdul Karim Sahitya Bisharad, littérateur and historian of Bangla literature
 Mohammad Yusuf Siddiq, historian, epigraphist, researcher, professor and author
 Pranab K. Sen, statistician, Cary C. Boshamer Professor of Biostatistics at the University of North Carolina at Chapel Hill
 Sumit Sarkar, historian
 Sukumar Sen, linguist
 Muhammad Shahidullah, educationist, writer, philologist, and linguist, theorist
 Abu Nasr Waheed, Islamic scholar, author, politician and educationist
 Nafees Bin Zafar, Academy Scientific and Technical Award, the first Bangladeshi to win an Oscar

Actors and entertainers

 Islah Abdur-Rahman, film director, actor and screenwriter
 Siam Ahmed, Bangladeshi actor, model
 Ruhul Amin, film director
 Alamgir, film actor and television host
 Niloy Alamgir, model and actor
 Afshan Azad, actress best known for the role of Padma Patil in Harry Potter
 Azim, actor best known for the role of Rahim Badshah in Rupban
 Amala Akkineni (née.Mukherjee), Bollywood actress
 Jaya Bachchan, Bollywood actress
 Bidita Bag, Bollywood and Bengali actress
 Ajitesh Bandopadhyay, stage and film actor
 Bhanu Bandopadhyay, Tollywood comic actor
 Jenni Banerjee, Indian origin Finnish actor
 Karuna Banerjee, first Indian actress earned BAFTA Award for Best Actress nomination at the 1959 BAFTA Awards
 Victor Banerjee, Bengali Tollywood, Bollywood and Hollywood actor; the only Indian to win National Board of Review Award for Best Actor
 Bipasha Basu, Bollywood actress
 Jaya Bhattacharya, actress
 Nivedita Bhattacharya, theatre actress
 Nusrat Jahan, Bengali actress
 Samit Bhanja, Bollywood and Bengali actor
 Chhabi Biswas, Bengali actor
 Seema Biswas, Bollywood actress
 Rahul Bose, Bengali and Bollywood actor and rugby player
 Sabyasachi Chakrabarty, Bollywood and Bengali actor
 Samrat Chakrabarti, British-American actor and musician
 Indrani Chakraborty, Bollywood actress
 Mithun Chakraborty, Bollywood and Bengali film actor
 Rhea Chakraborty, Bollywood actress
 Ritwick Chakraborty, Bengali actor
 Tulsi Chakraborty, Bengali actor
 Abhishek Chatterjee, Bengali film and television actor
 Anil Chatterjee, Bengali actor
 Biswajit Chatterjee, Bengali and Bollywood actor
 Dhritiman Chatterjee, Bollywood and Bengali actor
 Moushumi Chatterjee, Bengali actress
 Prasenjit Chatterjee, Tollywood and Bollywood actor
 Priyanshu Chatterjee, Bollywood actor
 Sabitri Chatterjee, Bengali actor
 Saswata Chatterjee, Bengali actor
 Soumitra Chatterjee, Bengali actor
 Subhendu Chatterjee, Bengali actor 
 Tannishtha Chatterjee, Bollywood and Bengali actress
 Jayanta Chattopadhyay, Bangladeshi actor
 Khaled Choudhury, theatre personality and artist
 Sarita Choudhury, Indian origin British film, Hollywood actress
 Chanchal Chowdhury, Bangladeshi actor
 Rafiqul Bari Chowdhury, cinematographer and director
 Shefali Chowdhury, actress best known for the role of Parvati Patil in Harry Potter
 Paoli Dam, actress
 Shraddha Das, Bollywood and Tollywood actress
 Dev, Tollywood actor
 Sumita Devi, Bangladeshi film and television actress
 Supriya Devi, Tollywood actress
 K. C. Dey, Bengali actor
 Utpal Dutt, Bengali actor
 Santosh Dutta Tollywood actor, famous for his portrayal of Jatayu in Feluda films of Satyajit Ray
 Tanushree Dutta, former Miss India and actress
 Ishita Dutta, actress
 Prasun Gain, Tollywood actor
 Richa Gangopadhyay, actress and Miss India USA 2007
 Mouli Ganguly, actress
 Preeti Ganguly, actress
 Roopa Ganguly, Bengali and Bollywood actress
 Rupali Ganguly, actress
 Rabi Ghosh, Bengali actor
 Reshmi Ghosh, actress, Miss India Earth 2002
 Sangita Ghosh, actress, model
 Shahana Goswami, Bollywood actress
 Abul Hayat, Bangladeshi actor
 Rizwan Hussain, TV personality, barrister and former CEO of Global Aid Trust
 Konnie Huq, British television presenter
 Nadiya Hussain, columnist, chef, author and TV personality best known for winning the baking competition The Great British Bake Off
 Khalil Ullah Khan, film and TV actor
 Shakib Khan, Bangladeshi actor, producer, singer, film organiser and media personality
 Anup Kumar, Tollywood actor
 Ashok Kumar, Bollywood actor
 Kishore Kumar, Bollywood singer, actor, music composer
 Pradeep Kumar, Bollywood actor
 Uttam Kumar, Bollywood and Bengali film actor
 Shaun Majumder, Canadian comedian and actor; winner of Gemini Awards
 Koena Mitra, former channel V VJ and Bollywood actress
 Rhona Mitra, half-Bengali actress in Britain
 Rani Mukerji, Bollywood and Kollywood actress
 Joy Mukherjee, Bollywood actor
 Kajol Mukherjee Bollywood actress
 Kamalini Mukherjee, Bollywood and Tollywood actress
 Madhabi Mukherjee, actress notable works include charulata, mahanagar
 Sagarika Mukherjee, Bollywood and Tollywood actress and playback singer
 Shantanu Mukherjee, Bollywood actor, playback singer and television presenter
 Swastika Mukherjee, Tollywood actress
 Colin Pal, actor and publicist
 Patralekha, Bollywood actress
 Raakhee, Bollywood actress
 Ashiqur Rahman
 Khan Ataur Rahman, Bengali actor, director, producer, screenplay writer, music composer and singer
 Devika Rani, Bollywood and Bengali actress
 Lisa Ray, actress and model
 Razzak, Bangladeshi actor
 Rola, Bengali-Japanese model, tarento and actress
 Ziaul Roshan, film actor and model
 Bikash Roy Tollywood actor
 Debashree Roy, Bollywood actress
 Mouni Roy, Bollywood actress
 Rahul Roy, Bollywood actor
 Reena Roy, Bollywood actress
 Rohit Roy, TV and Bollywood actor
 Ronit Roy, Bollywood and TV actor
 Pahari Sanyal Tollywood actor
 Aparna Sen, Bengali film actress
 Nandana Sen, Bollywood actress, daughter of Nobel laureate Amartya Sen
 Raima Sen, Bengali film and Bollywood actress
 Reema Sen, Bollywood and Kollywood actress
 Riddhi Sen, youngest recipient of the National Film Award for Best Actor 
 Rimi Sen, Bollywood actress
 Riya Sen, Bollywood actress
 Suchitra Sen, Bollywood and Bengali film actress
 Sushmita Sen, Bollywood actress
 Rituparna Sengupta, Bollywood and Bengali actress
 Ushoshi Sengupta, model, I Am She–Miss Universe India in 2010
 Shabnur, Bangladeshi actress
 Salman Shah, Bangladeshi actor
 Ali Shahalom, comedian and television presenter
 ATM Shamsuzzaman, Bangladeshi former actor
 Mamata Shankar, Bollywood and Bengali actress
 Konkona Sen Sharma, Bollywood actress
 Arifin Shuvoo, Bangladeshi actor
 Tiya Sircar, American actress
 Khushbu Sundar, Kollywood actress, producer and television presenter
 Sharmila Tagore, Bollywood and Bengali film actress
 Ruma Guha Thakurta, actress whose notable works include Ganashatru, Abhijan, Palatak; wife of Kishore Kumar

Artists and designers

Bharat Ratna

 Aruna Asaf Ali
 Pranab Mukherjee
 Satyajit Ray
 Bidhan Chandra Roy
 Amartya Sen
 Ravi Shankar

Bloggers / media artists

 Hasan M. Elahi, interdisciplinarysciplinary media artist 
 Pritish Nandy, poet, author, editor in chief, The Illustrated Weekly of India and Publishing Director and Managing Editor, The Times of India Group 1982-1991
 Reihan Salam, journalist, blogger at The American Scene and associate editor of The Atlantic Monthly

Business and industry

Billionaires

 Sanjit Biswas, Indian American entrepreneur and CEO/ Co-founder of Samsara (company), built and sold Meraki to Cisco for $1.2 billion. 
 Ankiti Bose, Founder of Zilingo
 Purnendu Chatterjee, Founder & Chairman, TCG Group, that owns Haldia Petrochemicals
 Tapan Chowdhury, CEO and MD of Square Pharmaceuticals, Square Group, Square Hospital and Maasranga Television
 Chandra Shekhar Ghosh, Founder, Managing Director & CEO of Bandhan Bank
 Pradeep Kar, Founder of Microland
 Salman F Rahman, Founder & Vice Chairman of BEXIMCO
 Sunil Kanti Roy, Founder of Peerless Group
 Aveek Sarkar, Vice Chairman & Editor Emeritus, Ananda Bazaar Patrika
 Ahmed Akbar Sobhan, Founder and Chairman of the Bashundhara Group

Business leaders

 Iqbal Ahmed OBE, entrepreneur and CEO of Seamark Group. In 2006, he became the highest British Bangladeshi to feature on the Sunday Times Rich List (listed at number 511). He has a net worth of $250 million.
 Syed Ahmed, British entrepreneur, businessman, television personality
 Prith Banerjee, CTO of ANSYS, former Director of HP Labs
 Arundhati Bhattacharya, chairperson and CEO of Salesforce India and first woman director of State Bank of India
 Kumar Bhattacharyya, Baron Bhattacharyya, Director, Warwick Manufacturing Group
 Mohammad Ebadul Karim Bulbul, managing director of Beacon Pharmaceuticals
 Sankar Chakraborti, Group CEO of Acuité Ratings and Research and founder of India's first ESG rating company, ESG Risk Assessments and Insights
 Moorad Choudhry, former managing director, Head of Business Treasury and Global Banking & Markets at Royal Bank of Scotland
 Mamun Chowdhury, businessman, and founder and co-director of London Tradition. In 2014, the company was awarded a Queen's Award for Enterprise for International Trade in recognition of its increase in sales.
 Rono Dutta, CEO of IndiGo
 Ashok Sekhar Ganguly, former chairman, Hindustan Unilever
 Aditya Ghosh, Co Founder of Akasa Air, Co Founder of Chourangi restaurant in London, former CEO (2008-2018) of IndiGo, Board Director of Oyo Rooms and Fabindia
 Anirvan Ghosh, CEO of Unity Biotechnology
 Asim Ghosh, former CEO of Husky Energy
 Rajat Gupta, first foreign-born Managing Director (chief executive) of management consultancy firm McKinsey & Company from 1994 to 2003; sentenced to two years of prison in 2012 for insider trading
 Omar Ishrak, chairman, Intel
 Mahee Ferdous Jalil, founder of Channel S, owner of Prestige Auto Group and TV presenter
 Sir Rajendra Nath Mookerjee, Founder of Martin & Co.
 Bhaskar Pramanik, chairman, Microsoft India
 Subir Raha, former head, ONGC
 Fayzur Rahman, chairman of Novoair
 M. A. Sattar, prominent industrialist. Founder and former chairman of Sattar Jute Mills and other enterprises, banker, and politician   
 Mutty Lall Seal, businessman and entrepreneur 
 Dwarkanath Tagore, known for partnership with the British East India Company

Entrepreneurs

 Muquim Ahmed, banking, travel, a chain of restaurants with the Cafe Naz group, publishing and property development.
 Badruddin Ajmal, managing director of Ajmal Perfumes and Lok Sabha MP from Dhubri, Assam
 Enam Ali, founder of the British Curry Awards, Spice Business Magazine and Ion TV
 Ragib Ali, industrialist, pioneer tea-planter, educationalist, philanthropist and banker who has a net worth of $250 million.
 Subroto Bagchi, founder and former chairman, Mindtree
 Somen Banerjee, Indian American entrepreneur and co-founder of Chippendales
 Siddhartha Basu, founder and CMD of BIG Synergy
 Amar Bose, founder of Bose Corporation
 Ankiti Bose, founder and CEO of Zilingo
 Amjad Khan Chowdhury, founder of PRAN-RFL Group
 Foysol Choudhury MBE, businessman, community activist and Chairman of Edinburgh and Lothians Regional Equality Council
 Anjan Chatterjee, founder, Speciality Group of Restaurants
 Alamohan Das, founder, India Machinery Company
 Sadhan Dutt, founder, Development Consultants of Kuljian Group
 Samit Ghosh, founder, MD and CEO of Ujjivan Small Finance Bank
 Snehasish Ganguly, Director of NK Gossain & Co., brother of former Indian cricket team captain and current Board of Control for Cricket in India President, Sourav Ganguly
 M. A. Hashem, founder and chairman of Partex Group
 Shelim Hussain, founder of Euro Foods (UK)
 Jawed Karim, co-founder of YouTube, first person to upload a video to the site
 Nitun Kundu, founder of Otobi
 Abdul Latif, British restaurateur known for his dish "Curry Hell"
 Ayub Ali Master, founder of the Shah Jalal Restaurant in London which became a hub for the early British Asian community.
 Tommy Miah MBE, celebrity chef, restaurateur and founder of the Indian Chef of the Year Competition.
 Abdul Monem, founder of Abdul Monem Limited
 Rajendra Nath Mookerjee, co-founder, Martin Burn Ltd, IISCO 
 Sabyasachi Mukherjee, founder & Managing Director of luxury Indian fashion brand, Sabyasachi
 Rajat Neogy, founder and editor, Transition Magazine in Kampala, Uganda in 1961
 Diptendu Pramanick, founder, Secretary of Eastern India Motion Pictures Association (EIMPA)
 Kamal Quadir, founder and CEO of CellBazaar Inc, first Mover Fellow of the Aspen Institute, TEDIndia Fellow
 Moulvi Syed Qudratullah, founder of Moulvibazar
 Shah Abdul Majid Qureshi, restaurateur
 Bajloor Rashid MBE, businessman and former president of the Bangladesh Caterers Association UK
 Arjun Ray (PVSM, VSM), founder, managing director and  chief executive officer of the Indus Trust and Indus International Schools
 Neeraj Roy, co-founder, Hungama Digital Media Entertainment Pvt. Ltd.
 Prannoy Roy, founder, NDTV
 Subrata Roy, founder and chairman, Sahara India Pariwar
 Sunil Kanti Roy, managing director of Peerless Group
 Chiki Sarkar, founder and Publisher of Juggernaut Books
 Barun Sengupta, founder of Bartaman
 Moosa Bin Shamsher, founder of GATCO
 Wali Tasar Uddin, entrepreneur, restaurateur and Chairman of the Bangladesh-British Chamber of Commerce
 Iqbal Quadir, founder of Grameenphone and bKash
 Muhammad Yunus, founder of Grameen Bank, "father of micro-finance", Nobel laureate

Sahitya Akademi Award

Cartoonists / comics creators 

 Jayanto Banerjee, Indian cartoonist and illustrator
 Neelabh Banerjee, Indian cartoonist and illustrator
 Sarnath Banerjee, graphic story writer, co-founded the comics publishing house Phantomville
 Samit Basu, comics writer at Virgin Comics
 Suddhasattwa Basu, illustrator
 Chittaprosad Bhattacharya, Indian cartoonist
 Rimi B. Chatterjee, graphic story writer
 Shamik Dasgupta, graphic story writer
 Narayan Debnath, creator of Nonte Phonte, Batul the Great, Handa Bhonda
 Chandi Lahiri, cartoonist and painter
 Satyajit Ray, filmmaker, creator of comic characters like Feluda and Professor Shonku
 Atanu Roy, illustrator
 Gaganendranath Tagore, cartoonist and painter

Cinematographers

 Ayananka Bose
 Sudeep Chatterjee
 Subrata Mitra
 Avik Mukhopadhyay
 Soumendu Roy

Criminals
Dhananjoy Chatterjee, first person judicially executed in India in the 21st century for murder
Roshu Kha, serial killer
Ershad Sikder, Bangladeshi criminal and serial killer from khulna city

Dadasaheb Phalke Award winners

 Ashok Kumar
 Hrishikesh Mukherjee
 Pankaj Mullick
 Devika Rani, first awardee
 Satyajit Ray
 Mrinal Sen
 Tapan Sinha
 B. N. Sircar

Diplomats
 Atul Chandra Chatterjee, Former Ambassador to the UK
 Chandrashekhar Dasgupta, Former Ambassador to China
 Bhupendra Nath Mitra, Former Ambassador to the UK
 Binay Ranjan Sen, Former Ambassador to the US
 Ronen Sen, Former Ambassador to the US and UK
 Samar Sen (diplomat), served as the 1st permanent representative to the United Nations, Geneva 
 Siddhartha Shankar Ray, Former Ambassador to the US

Economists

 Salahuddin Ahmed, 9th Governor of Bangladesh Bank
 Mir Masoom Ali, George and Frances Ball Distinguished Professor Emeritus of Statistics, Ball State University
 Abhijit Banerjee, Ford Foundation International Professor of Economics, Massachusetts Institute of Technology, co-founder of the Abdul Latif Jameel Poverty Action Lab, winner of Nobel Prize
 Pranab Bardhan, professor of economics, University of California, Berkeley, has been on the editorial board of a number of economics journals
 Kaushik Basu, Chief Economist, World Bank; C. Marks Professor of International Studies and Professor of Economics, Cornell University
 Arundhati Bhattacharya, first woman director of SBI, largest bank in India
 P.C. Bhattacharya, former governor of Reserve Bank of India
 Amitava Bose, professor of economics at the Indian Institute of Management, Calcutta
 Suma Chakrabarti, President of European Bank for Reconstruction and Development
 Shegufta Bakht Chaudhuri, 4th Governor of Bangladesh Bank
 Amiya Kumar Dasgupta, one of the founders, in 1949, of the internationally known journal The Economic Weekly (current name, Economic and Political Weekly)
 Partha Dasgupta, FRS, Frank Ramsey Professor Emeritus of Economics, University of Cambridge
 Bibek Debroy, economist and linguist, author of Sanskrit titbits blog
 Romesh Chunder Dutt, Indian civil servant economic historian
 Mohammed Farashuddin, 7th Governor of Bangladesh Bank, founder of East West University
 Anil Kumar Gain, statistician from the University of Cambridge, Fellow of the Royal Society
 Maitreesh Ghatak, current editor of Journal of Development Economics; contributions in microfinance, property pights, public organizations
 Amitav Ghosh, former governor of Reserve Bank of India
 N. C. Sen Gupta, former governor of Reserve Bank of India
 Nurul Islam, economist, former chairman, Bangladesh Planning Commission
 Akbar Ali Khan, economist
 Shah A M S Kibria, economist, diplomat and former executive secretary of the United Nations' ESCAP
 Prasanta Chandra Mahalanobis, founder of Indian Statistical Institute
 Syed Abdul Majid, pioneer of the agricultural industry of Bengal & Assam, first minister of Assam
 Abul Maal Abdul Muhith, former Finance Minister of Bangladesh
 Saifur Rahman, longest serving Finance Minister of Bangladesh and a leader of BNP
 Debraj Ray, Silver Professor of Economics, New York University; co-editor of the American Economic Review; has served on the editorial board of several international journals
 Amartya Sen, economist and philosopher, Lamont Professor at Harvard University, winner of the Nobel Prize
 Rehman Sobhan, economist, Chairman of the Center for Policy Dialogue (CPD)
 Muhammad Yunus, economist, founder of Grameen Bank, winner of the Nobel Prize

Fellows of the Royal Society

 Kumar Bhattacharyya
 Jagdish Chandra Bose
 Satyendra Nath Bose
 Partha Dasgupta
 Anil Kumar Gain
 Prasanta Chandra Mahalanobis
 Ashesh Prasad Mitra
 Sisir Kumar Mitra
 Meghnad Saha
 Ashoke Sen

Fictional characters

Filmmakers

Grammy winners

 Sandeep Das, award for Best World Music Album, at the 59th Grammy Awards, 2017
 Norah Jones, 9-time winner
 Ravi Shankar, 5-time winner

Journalists

Bangladesh
 Shah Alamgir, journalist
 Syed Mohammad Ali, founder of The Daily Star - the largest circulating daily English-language newspaper in Bangladesh. 
 Mahfuz Anam
 Abul Asad
 Nurjahan Begum
 Salah Choudhury, editor of Weekly Blitz
 Sanjeeb Choudhury
 Shamim Chowdhury, TV and print journalist for Al Jazeera English
 Lenin Gani, senior member of the Bangladesh Sports Journalists Association
 Abdul Hafiz, writer, essayist and journalist
 Shahriar Kabir
 Abed Khan
 Sirajul Hossain Khan, editor of Pakistan Times and the Eastern News Agency.
 Fazle Lohani
 A B M Musa
 Syed Nahas Pasha, journalist and editor of Janomot and Curry Life
 Abdul Quadir, poet, essayist and journalist
 Matiur Rahman
 Manik Chandra Saha
 Ataus Samad
 Shykh Seraj
 Hassan Shahriar, journalist
 Morshed Noman
Journalist

India
 Swapan Dasgupta, journalist
 Sunanda K. Datta-Ray, journalist
 Sagarika Ghose, editor at CNN-IBN
 Chandan Mitra, editor and managing director of The Pioneer newspaper
 Ramananda Chatterjee, "father of Indian journalism"
 Udayan Mukherjee, editor and anchor in CNBC India
 Pritish Nandy, Publishing Director and Managing Editor, The Times of India Group; Editor in Chief, The Illustrated Weekly of India; chairman, Pritish Nandy Communications Ltd
 Prannoy Roy, founder and President of NDTV, one of India's largest television and media production houses
 Samar Sen, journalist
 Barun Sengupta, political critic, founder-editor of Bartaman newspaper
 Vishnu Som, news anchor and journalist

America
 Sanjiv Bhattacharya
 Bobby Ghosh (Aparisim Ghosh), journalist, former TIME magazine World Editor; the first non-American to be named World Editor in TIMEs more than 80 years
 Reihan Salam

United Kingdom
 Fareena Alam
 Lisa Aziz, British television news presenter
 Mihir Bose, BBC's head sports editor
 Reeta Chakrabarti, political correspondent for the BBC Television's Breakfast programme shown on BBC One and the BBC News Channel
 Mo Dutta, former TV presenter for BBC Radio 2, BBC Asian Network, BBC Radio Kent
 Pallab Ghosh, BBC News science reporter
 Nina Hossain, British television news broadcaster
 Faisal Islam, current Economics Editor of BBC News. Former Political Editor of Sky News
 Tasmin Lucia Khan, English journalist and television presenter
 Hasina Momtaz, former press officer for the Mayor of London
 Sarah Mukherjee, former BBC Environment Correspondent, currently a regular contributor on Radio 4's Today programme

Pakistan
 Zaib-un-Nissa Hamidullah, Pakistan's first female editor; first woman to be included in a press delegation; in 1955, became the first woman to speak at the ancient al Azhar University in Cairo, Egypt
 Altaf Husain, 1st editor-in-chief of Pakistan's oldest, leading and most widely read English-language newspaper, Dawn and former Industry Minister of Pakistan

Qatar
 Shiulie Ghosh, television journalist at Al Jazeera English

Uganda
 Rajat Neogy, journalist, poet, columnist, founding editor of Transition Magazine

Law

 Shohid Ali, advocate
 Syed Ameer Ali, prominent Indian (British Indian) lawyer, key jurist of Muslim personal law, founding member of All India Muslim League
 Bankim Chandra Ray, former Chief Justice of India
 Kalyan Banerjee, Rotary International's 101st President
 Gooroodas Banerjee, former High Court judge, Calcutta
 Mahmudul Amin Choudhury, 11th Chief Justice of Bangladesh
 Sudhi Ranjan Das, former Chief Justice of India
 Monomohun Ghose, first practising barrister of Indian origin
 Kamal Hossain, considered the architect of Bangladeshi Constitution and icon of secular democracy in South Asia; prominent international lawyer and arbitrator
 Sara Hossain, Bangladeshi lawyer, executive director of BLAST, one of the recipients of the 2016 International Women of Courage Award
 Syed A. B. Mahmud Hossain, 2nd Chief Justice of Bangladesh
 J. R. Mudassir Husain, 14th Chief Justice of Bangladesh
 M Amir-ul Islam, Bangladeshi Lawyer, member of the drafting committee of Bangladeshi constitution
 Altamas Kabir, former Chief Justice of India
 Irene Khan, Bangladeshi lawyer, first woman to be appointed as the United Nations Special Rapporteur for freedom of expression and opinion; seventh Secretary General of Amnesty International (2001–2009); former Director-General of the International Development Law Organization
 Muhammed Abdul Muid Khan, nominated as the Best Human Rights Lawyer of England and Wales in 2012
 Nitish Chandra Laharry,  first person of Asian origin to be elected as the president of Rotary International
 Sabyasachi Mukharji, former Chief Justice of India
 Bijan Kumar Mukherjea, former Chief Justice of India
 Abdul Moshabbir, lawyer and politician
 Radhabinod Pal, Indian member appointed to the International Military Tribunal for the Far East, one of the three Asian judges of Tokyo trial
 A. N. Ray, former Chief Justice of India
 Khatun Sapnara, judge and first non-white to be elected to the Family Law Bar Association Committee. In 2006, she was appointed as a Recorder of the Crown, which made her the only person of Bangladeshi origin in a senior judicial position.
 Amal Kumar Sarkar, former Chief Justice of India
 Abu Sadat Mohammad Sayem, first Chief Justice of Bangladesh
 Amarendra Nath Sen, former judge in Supreme Court of India
 Ashoke Kumar Sen, Indian barrister, former Cabinet minister of India, Indian parliamentarian
 Satyendra Prasanno Sinha, 1st Baron Sinha, prominent lawyer and statesman in British India, first Indian to become member of British cabinet

Magicians
 Jewel Aich
 Maneka Sorcar
 P. C. Sorcar
 P. C. Sorcar, Jr.

Musicians

Bangla rock 
 Shafin Ahmed
 Shishir Ahmed
 Ayub Bachchu, founding member and the leader of the Bengali rock band Love Runs Blind (LRB)
 Balam
 Partha Barua
 Chandril Bhattacharya, lyricist and one of the founders of the Bangla band Chandrabindoo
 Nachiketa Chakraborty
 Anindya Chatterjee, lead vocalist and one of the founders of the Bengali band Chandrabindoo
 Gautam Chattopadhyay, composer, founder of the group Mohiner Ghoraguli, One of the first rock vocalists of India
 Somlata Acharyya Chowdhury, lead singer of Bangla rock band Somlata and The Aces
 Anjan Dutt, singer, composer and lyricist
 Rupam Islam, frontman of Bengali hard rock band Fossils
 James
 Ibrahim Ahmed Kamal, guitarist for Warfaze, one of the pioneers of Bengali and Bangladeshi heavy metal
 Khan (Azam Khan), one of the pioneers of Bengali rock, pop guru and rock guru of Bangladesh, freedom fighter
 Bappa Mazumder
 Alamgir Haq, former member of the first Bengali Band Iolites, known as the Elvis Presley of the west
 Syed Hasanur Rahman, vocalist of Ark
 Raef al Hasan Rafa
 Kabir Suman
 Sharmin Sultana Sumi, vocalist for Chirkutt
 Khaled 'Bassbaba' Sumon, vocalist for Aurthohin
 Tanzir Tuhin, former vocalist of Shironamhin, current vocalist of Avash
 Ziaur Rahman Zia

Bangladeshi film industry 
 Abdul Alim, National Award-winning playback singer
 Asif Akbar, National Award-winning playback singer
 Momtaz Begum, National Award-winning playback singer
 Kumar Biswajit, National Award-winning playback singer and composer
 Ahmed Imtiaz Bulbul, freedom fighter and National Award-winning music director
 Kanak Chapa, National Award-winning playback singer
 Priyanka Gope, National Award-winning playback singer
 Syed Abdul Hadi, National Award-winning playback singer
 Abdul Jabbar, National Award-winning playback singer
 Alam Khan, National Award-winning music director and composer
 Monir Khan, National Award-winning playback singer
 Andrew Kishore, National Award-winning playback singer
 Runa Laila, National Award-winning playback singer and composer
 Bappa Mazumder, Singer, National Award-winning composer
 Mahmudun Nabi, National Award-winning playback singer
 Subir Nandi, National Award-winning playback singer
 Baby Nazneen, National Award-winning playback singer
 Farida Parveen, National Award-winning playback singer
 Khan Ataur Rahman, National Award-winning music director and composer
 Shahnaz Rahmatullah, National Award-winning playback singer
 Emon Saha, National Award-winning music director and composer
 Satya Saha, National Award-winning music director
 S I Tutul, National Award-winning playback singer and composer
 Habib Wahid, National Award-winning music director
 Sabina Yasmin, National Award-winning playback singer

Bollywood

Classical and folk musicians

 Abbas Uddin Ahmed (1901–1959)
 Abdul Alim
 Kanika Banerjee (1924–2000), Rabindrasangeet performer
 Nikhil Banerjee (1931–1986), sitar performer
 Purna Das Baul (born 1933), known as 'Baul-samrat', pioneering folk artist known for working with Bob Dylan
 Firoza Begum (1930–2014), eminent exponent of Nazrul Geeti
 Momtaz Begum (born 1974), Bangladeshi folk singer, world record holder
 Dhananjay Bhattacharya (1922–1992), Shyama Sangeet singer
 Pannalal Bhattacharya (c. 1930 – 1966), singer
 Debabrata Biswas (1911–1980), Rabindrasangeet performer
 Kumar Bose (born 1953), tabla performer and composer
 Tanmoy Bose (born 1963), table master, composer, actor, fusion musician
 Swapan Chaudhuri, tabla exponent
 Ajoy Chakrabarty (born 1952)
 Arnab Chakrabarty (born 1980), Indian classical musician, sarod player
 Anjan Chattopadhyay, sitar player
 Annapurna Devi (1927–2018), surbahar performer
 Swagatalakshmi Dasgupta, classical and rabindrasangeet exponent performer, also folk modern and devotional music
 Naina Devi (1917–1993), Indian classical singer
 Pandit Jnan Prakash Ghosh (1909–1997), tabla master, composer and musician
 Pannalal Ghosh (1911–1960), pioneering master of the Indian classical flute, composer, musicologist
 Shankar Ghosh (1935–2016), tabla master and singer
 Shah Abdul Karim (1916–2009)
 Ali Akbar Khan (1922–2009), sarod performer, composer, musicologist, founder of the Ali Akbar College of Music in California, US
 Allauddin Khan (1862–1972)
 Shahadat Hossain Khan (born 1958), Sarod virtuoso, composer, musicologist, international master, renowned Sarod player
 Vilayat Khan (1928–2004), sitar performer
 Runa Laila (born 1952), folk, ghazal, and pop fusion singer
 Lalon (1784–1890), mystic devotional composer and singer
 Abdul Latif
 Suchitra Mitra (1924–2011), rabindrasangeet performer, also playback singer and composer
 Kalyan Mukherjea (1943–2010)
 Budhaditya Mukherjee
 Kashinath Mukherjee (1925–2011), Hindustani classical musician and sitar player of Etawah Gharana
 Manabendra Mukhopadhyay (1931–1992), singer and composer
 Farida Parveen (born 1954), Lalon singer
 Hason Raja (1854–1922)
 Ritwik Sanyal (born 1953)
 Indrani Sen, rabindrasangeet and nazrulgeeti performer, also modern and folk songs
 Srabani Sen, rabindrasangeet performer, also modern and folk songs
 Anoushka Shankar (born 1981), sitar player and composer
 Ravi Shankar (1920–2012), sitar virtuoso, composer, musicologist
 Chitra Singh, Hindi/Urdu ghazal singer and wife of Jagjit Singh
 Ruma Guha Thakurta (1934–2019), founder and lead singer of Calcutta Youth Choir and playback singer
 Alka Yagnik (born 1966)

Hindi rock

 Asheem Chakravarty, co-founder of the popular Indian band Indian Ocean
 Palash Sen, lead vocalist of Indian band Euphoria
 Susmit Sen, co-founder of the popular Indian band Indian Ocean

Western

 Sameer Bhattacharya, lead guitarist of the American alternative rock band Flyleaf
 Futurecop!, electronic band, members include Manzur Iqbal from United Kingdom
 Norah Jones, American singer-songwriter, musician, and actress, daughter of sitar virtuoso Ravi Shankar; Indian Bengali
 Sanjaya Malakar, American born Indian origin singer
 Shikhee, singer; auteur of American industrial band Android Lust
 Mumzy Stranger
 Monica Yunus, operatic soprano

Military

Bangladesh

 Shakil Ahmed, former head of Bangladesh Rifles
 Mohammad Ruhul Amin, awarded Bir Sreshtho, the highest military award of Bangladesh; war hero of Bangladesh Liberation War 
 Saiful Azam, served under Bangladesh Air Force, Iraqi Air Force, Pakistan Air Force and Royal Jordanian Air Force
 Hasan Mashhud Chowdhury, 11th Chief of Army Staff of the Bangladesh Army
 Ismail Faruque Chowdhury, engineer-in-chief of the Bangladesh Army
 Saiful Islam Duke, former Lieutenant Commander of Bangladesh Navy
 Chitta Ranjan Dutta, Bangladeshi war hero and retired Major-General of the Bangladesh Army, key sector commander of the Mukti Bahini during the Bangladesh Liberation War
 Syed Mohammad Ziaul Haque, Bangladesh Army officer and fugitive
 Nurul Huq, second temporary chief of Bangladesh Navy
 AB Tajul Islam, retired Bangladesh Army captain and former Minister of Liberation War Affairs
 Mohiuddin Jahangir, awarded Bir Sreshtho, the highest military award of Bangladesh, war hero of Bangladesh Liberation War
 Sina Ibn Jamali, former lieutenant general and Chief of General Staff in Army Headquarters
 Mahbub Ali Khan, Bangladesh Navy rear admiral and the Chief of Naval Staff
 Sultan Shahriar Rashid Khan, army officer convicted for the assassination of Sheikh Mujibur Rahman
 Abdul Karim Khandker, Bir Uttam war hero
 Anwarul Momen, general officer commanding 17th Infantry Division
 Khaled Mosharraf, Sector Commander, war hero of Bangladesh Independence War
 Abu Saleh Mohammad Nasim, 7th Chief of Army Staff of the Bangladesh Army
 General M. A. G. Osmani, Supreme Commander of Bangladesh Forces during the Bangladesh Liberation War
 Mohammad Abdur Rab, 1st Chief of Army Staff of the Bangladesh Army, Major general during the Bangladesh Liberation War
 Abul Fazal Ziaur Rahman, physician and army officer martyred in the liberation war
 AKM Asadul Haq, physician and army officer martyred in the liberation war
 Hamidur Rahman, awarded Bir Sreshtho the highest military award of Bangladesh, war hero of Bangladesh Liberation War
 Rahman, awarded Bir Sreshtho the highest military award of Bangladesh, war hero of Bangladesh Liberation War
 Ziaur Rahman, Bir Uttam war hero, Sector Commander, strategic war hero Of 1971 Bangladesh Independence War
 Munshi Abdur Rouf, awarded Bir Sreshtho, the highest military award of Bangladesh; war hero of Bangladesh Liberation War
 Muhammad Ghulam Tawab, Bangladesh's second Chief of Air Staff
 Ashab Uddin, major general and ambassador to Kuwait and Yemen
 Sarwar Hossain, Army General and former Military Secretary to the President of Bangladesh.

India

 Flight Lieutenant Suhas Biswas (1924–1957), recipient of Ashoka Chakra
 Subhas Chandra Bose (1897–1945), leader, Indian National Army
 Air Marshal Padma Bandopadhyay, PVSM, AVSM, VSM, first woman to be promoted to three-star rank in the Indian Air Force
 Air Vice Marshal Madhavendra Banerji (1934–2019), MVC, VM of Indian Air Force
 Major General (Retd.) Dipankar Banerjee (general), Founding Director of the Institute of Peace and Conflict Studies
 Vice Admiral Pradeep Kumar Chatterjee, Indian Navy, later Commander-in-Chief, Andaman and Nicobar Command
 Admiral Adhar Kumar Chatterji (1914–2001), Indian Navy Chief 1966–1970
 General Joyanto Nath Chaudhuri (1908–1983), Indian Army Chief during the Indo-Pakistani War of 1965
 Commodore Ajitendu Chakraverti, Indian Navy, first Indian officer to be promoted to Commodore
 Group Captain Suranjan Das, pioneering test pilot of Indian Air Force
 Vice Admiral Biswajit Dasgupta, AVSM, YSM, VSM, Flag Officer Commanding-in-Chief, Eastern Naval Command 
 Lieutenant General (retd.) Abhijit Guha (Indian Army officer), Head of the UN Mission to Support the Hodeidah Agreement
 Wing Commander Karun Krishna Majumdar, Distinguished Flying Cross (United Kingdom) and first Indian to reach the rank of Wing Commander
 Air Commodore Sudhindra Kumar Majumdar (1927–2011), India's first military helicopter pilot
 Colonel Avijit Misra, an Indian Army Colonel
 Air Marshal Subroto Mukherjee (1911–1960), former Head of Indian Air Force
 Chief of the Air Staff Designate Arup Raha, 24th chief of Indian Air Force
 Dr. Wing Commander Ashis Roy, MD FRCS, first Indian man to complete 100 marathons
 Indra Lal Roy (1898–1918), first Indian (pre Independence) flying ace
 General Shankar Roychowdhury (born 1937), former Indian Army Chief
 Lieutenant General Lionel Protip Sen, Distinguished Service Order

Other
 Abu Hena Saiful Islam (born 1963), Muslim chaplain for the US Navy
 Kalapahad (died 1575), military general for the Karrani dynasty
 Masum Khan (born 1604), Zamindar of Sarail and soldier of the Mughal empire
 Hayat Mahmud, military general and Zamindar of Buzurg-Umedpur

Padma Vibhushan

 Milon K. Banerji
 Nand Lal Bose
 Satyendra Nath Bose
 Suniti Kumar Chatterji
 D. P. Chattopadhyaya
 Joyanto Nath Chaudhuri
 Bhabatosh Datta
 Niren De
 Basanti Devi
 Ashok Sekhar Ganguly
 Prasanta Chandra Mahalanobis
 Ajoy Mukherjee
 Benode Behari Mukherjee
 Hirendranath Mukherjee
 Hrishikesh Mukherjee
 Pranab Mukherjee
 Basanti Dulal Nagchaudhuri
 Radhabinod Pal
 Satyajit Ray
 Binay Ranjan Sen
 Ravi Shankar
 Uday Shankar

Politicians

Bangladesh

 Tajuddin Ahmad, first Prime Minister of Bangladesh (1971-1972)
 Abdus Samad Azad, former Minister of Foreign Affairs
 Abdul Hamid Khan Bhashani, popularly known with the honorary title Mazlum Jananeta (Leader of the Oppressed)
 Dr. A.Q.M. Badruddoza Chowdhury, former President of Bangladesh (2001-2002) and the founder of Bikalpa Dhara Bangladesh
 Mukhlesur Rahman Chowdhury, de facto President and Prime Minister, former Adviser to Iajuddin Ahmed
 Hussain Muhammad Ershad, Chief Martial Law Administrator (CMLA), later President (1982-1990) and founder of the Jatiya party
Kamal Hossain, lawyer, founder of Gano Forum and the leader of Jatiya Oikiya front alliance
 A. K. Fazlul Huq, first Prime Minister of Bengal (Undivided), presented the Lahore Resolution with the official proposal of partition of India, Governor of East Pakistan
 Serajul Huq, one of the founding member of the Bangladesh Awami League
 AK Abdul Momen, incumbent Minister of Foreign Affairs
 Shamsul Huda Panchbagi (1897-1988), founder of the Emarat Party and member of the Bengal Legislative Assembly 
 Ghulam Mahmood Quader, chairman of the Jatiya party
 Sheikh Mujibur Rahman, Bengali nationalist politician, President of Awami League, served as the first President of Bangladesh and second Prime Minister of Bangladesh, voted as the Greatest Bengali of all time in 2004 BBC's opinion poll
 Tarique Rahman (born 1967), acting chairman of the Bangladesh Nationalist Party
 Ziaur Rahman, founder of Bangladesh Nationalist Party, President of Bangladesh (1977-1981), proposed the creation of SAARC, sector commander and liberation war hero
 Zillur Rahman (1929-2013), former President of Bangladesh (2009-2013)
 Sheikh Hasina Wazed, Prime Minister of Bangladesh (1996-2001; 2009-present)
 Khaleda Zia, Prime Minister of Bangladesh (1991-1996; 2001-2006), "mother of democracy", leader of democracy movement in Bangladesh, first female PM of Bangladesh
 Abdur Rashid Tarkabagish (1900-1986), second president of the All Pakistan Awami Muslim League

British India

 Aftab Ali, founder of All-India Seamen's Federation and vice-president of All-India Trade Union Congress
 Aruna Asaf Ali, Indian independence activist
 Mahmud Ali, Freedom Movement leader, statesman
 Abul Kalam Azad, senior leader of the Indian National Congress during the Indian independence movement
 Rash Behari Bose, revolutionary leader against the British Raj in India and one of the key organisers of the Ghadar conspiracy and later, the Indian National Army
 Ajmal Ali Choudhury, prominent in the Sylhet referendum movement
 Moinul Hoque Choudhury, five-time MLA, two-time UN General Assembly representative and Minister of Industrial Development
 Chittaranjan Das, prominent in the Indian independence movement (also known as Deshabandhu)
 Abdul Halim Ghaznavi, politician, industrialist and minister
 Abdul Karim Ghaznavi, politician, traveler and minister
 Muhammad Hasanuzzaman, educationist and member of the Bengal Legislative Assembly for Tippera North
 Syed Shamsul Huda, Nawab of Gokarna, president of the All India Muslim League
 Hatem Ali Jamadar, member of the Bengal Legislative Assembly and East Bengal Legislative Assembly
 Nawab Ali Haider Khan, 9th Nawab of Longla, minister and leader of the Independent Muslim Party
 Sucheta Kriplani, freedom fighter and politician
 Nawab Abdul Latif, educator and social worker
 Syed Abdul Majid CIE, first native minister of Assam, pioneer of the agricultural industry
 Abdul Matlib Mazumdar, freedom fighter and political leader known for retaining the Barak Valley in India
 Abdul Kader Mia, member of the Bengal Legislative Assembly and East Bengal Legislative Assembly
 Sarojini Naidu, freedom fighter and poet
 Bipin Chandra Pal, Indian nationalist, one third of the Lal Bal Pal triumvirate
 Wajed Ali Khan Panni, Zamindar of Karatia, politician and educationist
 Khwaja Salimullah, founder of Muslim League, proposed establishing University of Dhaka

India

West Bengal
 Muzaffar Ahmad, one of the founders of the Communist Party of India
 Syed Badrudduja, former Mayor of Kolkata
 Mamata Banerjee, Chief Minister of West Bengal (from 2011), ex-minister for Railways, Government of India, Chairman All India Trinamool Congress
 Mrinal Banerjee, former Minister
 Surendranath Banerjee, one of the founding members of the Indian National Congress
 Jyoti Basu, former communist Chief Minister of West Bengal, former Politburo Member of the Communist Party of India(Marxist)
 Buddhadeb Bhattacharya, former communist Chief Minister of West Bengal, Politburo Member of the Communist Party of India (Marxist) after 19th Party Congress
 Suvendu Adhikari, current Leader of Opposition in West Bengal Legislative Assembly from Bharatiya Janata Party and four-term MLA from Nandigram, former cabinet minister and two term MP from Trinamool Congress 
 Tanmoy Bhattacharya, politician, elected MLA of North Dum Dum constituency, 2016-2021
 Dilip Ghosh, politician and MP from Bharatiya Janata Party, former MLA and state president of BJP.
 Womesh Chandra Bonnerjee, first president of Indian National Congress
 Subhas Chandra Bose, former President of Indian National Congress, Head of State of India's first free Provisional Government of Azad Hind and co-foounder Indian National Army
 Somnath Chatterjee, former Speaker of the Lok Sabha (Lower House of Parliament), expelled member of CPI(M), senior parliamentarian, prominent barrister
 A. B. A. Ghani Khan Choudhury, senior leader of Indian National Congress
 Abu Ayesh Mondal, chairman of West Bengal Minority Development & Finance Corporation, former MLA of Monteswar and former MP of Katwa
 Mehbub Mondal, former MLA of Galsi
 Rafikul Islam Mondal, former MLA of North Basirhat
 Rahima Mondal, former MLA of Deganga
 Pranab Mukherjee, former president of India, Minister for External Affairs, senior leader of Indian National Congress
 Shyama Prasad Mukherjee, founder of Bharatiya Jana Sangh, later Bharatiya Janata Party
 Siddhartha Shankar Ray, former Congress Chief Minister of West Bengal, former Indian ambassador to United States
 Bidhan Chandra Roy, physician, former Congress Chief Minister of West Bengal, Bharat Ratna
 Ashoke Kumar Sen, former Law Minister, barrister, and parliamentarian

Assam
 Abdur Rahim Ahmed, MLA of Barpeta
 Hafiz Bashir Ahmed, MLA of Bilasipara West
 Jahan Uddin Ahmed, member of Lok Sabha for Dhubri
 Jamal Uddin Ahmed, former MLA of Badarpur
 Kobad Hussain Ahmed, inaugural MLA of Mankachar
 Moinuddin Ahmed, former MLA of Jaleswar
 Sahab Uddin Ahmed, former MLA of Jaleswar
 Sherman Ali Ahmed, MLA of Baghbar
 Siddique Ahmed, MLA of Karimganj South
 Abdur Rahim Ajmal, politician in Jamunamukh
 Abdur Rahman Ajmal, politician in Salmara
 Badruddin Ajmal, founder of the All India United Democratic Front (AIUDF) and president of Jamiat Ulema-e-Hind's Assam branch
 Sirajuddin Ajmal, MLA of  Jamunamukh and founder of Ajmal Foundation
 Abul Kalam Rasheed Alam, MLA of Goalpara East
 Sheikh Shah Alam, former MLA of Goalpara West
 Amjad Ali, two-time member of Lok Sabha for Dhubri
 Abul Kalam Azad, former MLA of Bhabanipur
 Abdul Aziz, MLA of Badarpur
 Hazi Salim Uddin Barbhuiya, MLA of Hailakandi
 Karim Uddin Barbhuiya, MLA of Sonai
 Gul Akhtara Begum, former MLA of Bilasipara East
 Abdul Munim Choudhury, former MLA of Karimganj South
 Khalilur Rahman Chowdhury, former MLA of Jamunamukh
 Nizam Uddin Choudhury, former MLA of Algapur
 Rashida Haque Choudhury, former Minister of State for Social Welfare
 Wazed Ali Choudhury, MLA of Salmara South
 Santosh Mohan Dev, former Union Cabinet Minister, elected to the Lok Sabha, senior leader of Indian National Congress
 Abdul Hamid, member of Lok Sabha for Dhubri
 Ali Hossain, former MLA of Sarukhetri
 Rasul Hoque, former MLA of Dhubri
 Najrul Hoque, MLA of Dhubri
 Samsul Huda, MLA of Bilasipara East
 Ahmed Hussain, member of Lok Sabha for Dhubri
 Anwar Hussain, member of Lok Sabha for Dhubri
 Ashraful Hussain, MLA of Chenga
 Ismail Hussain, former MLA of Barpeta
 Monowar Hussain, former MLA of Goalpara East
 Adv. Aminul Islam, general secretary and chief spokesperson for AIUDF
 Aminul Islam, former MLA of Dhing
 Aminul Islam, former MLA of Mankachar
 Hosenara Islam, first female MLA of Mankachar
 Nurul Islam, member of Lok Sabha for Dhubri
 Rafiqul Islam, MLA of Jania
 Zabed Islam, former MLA of Mankachar
 Zahirul Islam, second MLA of Mankachar
 Abdul Khaleque, former MLA of Jania
 Abdur Rahim Khan, former MLA of Barpeta
 Aziz Ahmed Khan, former MLA of Karimganj South
 Liakat Ali Khan, former MLA of Chenga
 Abdul Batin Khandakar, MLA of Abhayapuri North
 Aminul Haque Laskar, BJP politician of Sonai
 Anwar Hussain Laskar, former MLA of Hailakandi
 Misbahul Islam Laskar, MLA of Barkhola
 Suzam Uddin Laskar, AIUDF politician
 Zakir Hussain Laskar, MLA of Hailakandi
 Ataur Rahman Mazarbhuiya, AIUDF politician and leader of Nadwatut Tameer
 Abdur Rashid Mandal, MLA of Goalpara West
 Abdul Muhib Mazumder, one of the architects of the Illegal Migrants (Determination by Tribunals) Act, 1983
 Khalil Uddin Mazumder, MLA of Katigorah
 Aftabuddin Mollah, MLA of Jaleswar
 Motiur Rohman Mondal, former MLA of Mankachar
 Abu Saleh Najmuddin, former MLA of Badarpur
 A. F. Golam Osmani, Indian National Congress member
 Kabindra Purkayastha, former Minister
 Afzalur Rahman, inaugural MLA of Jaleswar
 Nijanur Rahman, MLA of Gauripur
 Abdur Rouf, former MLA of Jania
 Abdus Sobahan Ali Sarkar, MLA of Golakganj
 Zakir Hussain Sikdar, MLA of Sarukhetri
 Jahan Uddin, former MLA of Dhubri

Bihar
Dulal Chandra Goswami is an Indian politician. He was elected to the Lok Sabha, lower house of the Parliament of India from Katihar in the 2019 Indian general election as member of the Janata Dal (United).
Ajit Sarkar represented Purnia four times in the Bihar Legislative Assembly from CPIM between 1980 and 1998 for 18 years until 14 June 1998 when he was gunned down with his driver Harendra Sharma and party worker Ashfaqur Rehman in broad daylight at Subhash Nagar in Purnia.
Madhavi Sarkar represented Purnia Bihar Legislative Assembly from CPIM between 1998 and 2000

Meghalaya
 Akramozzaman, inaugural MLA of Phulbari
 Shamsul Hoque, inaugural MLA of Mahendraganj
 Khorsedur Rahman Khan, former MLA of Rajabala
 S. G. Esmatur Mominin, current MLA of Phulbari
 Abu Taher Mondal, former three-time MLA of Phulbari
 Mozibur Rahman, inaugural MLA of Rajabala 
 Abdus Saleh, MLA of Rajabala and former two-time MLA of Mahendraganj
 Manirul Islam Sarkar, former two-time MLA of Phulbari and Minister of Agriculture & Transport
 Azad Zaman, former MLA of Rajabala

Other
S. M. Banerjee, 4-time M.P. of Kanpur as an Independent candidate with support of CPI from 1962 to 1977.
Shyamdev Roy Chaudhari, 7-time M.L.A of South Varanasi from Bharatiya Janata Party
 Rabi Ray, speaker of Lok Sabha
 Manik Sarkar, chief minister of Tripura, Politburo member
 Ashab Uddin, member of the Manipur Legislative Assembly for Jiribam

Pakistan
 Nurul Amin, Prime Minister of Pakistan
 Abdullah al-Baqi (1886-1952), member of the 1st National Assembly of Pakistan
 Mohammad Ali Bogra, Prime Minister of Pakistan 1953–1955
 Abdul Matin Chaudhary, served as the first Agriculture Minister of Pakistan
 Abdul Hamid, first Education Minister of East Bengal
 Abu Ahmad Abdul Hafiz, Muslim League politician and lawyer
 Abdul Wahab Khan, 3rd Speaker of the National Assembly of Pakistan
 Abdullah al Mahmood (d. 1975), member of the 1st National Assembly of Pakistan
 Jogendra Nath Mandal, served as the first Law & Labour Minister of Pakistan
 Iskander Mirza, first President of Pakistan
 Khawaja Nazimuddin, 2nd Prime Minister of Bengal (Undivided), 2nd Prime Minister of Pakistan, 2nd Governor-General of Pakistan, President of Muslim League
 Khurram Khan Panni, former Chief Whip of East Pakistan Provincial Assembly
 Huseyn Shaheed Suhrawardy, second Chief Minister of Bengal, Prime Minister of Pakistan (1956–1957)

United Kingdom

Lisa Nandy Indian(Bengali)-British politician serving as Shadow Secretary of State for Levelling Up, Housing and Communities since 2021. A member of the Labour Party, she has been Member of Parliament (MP) for Wigan since 2010. 

 Nasim Ali OBE, Labour Party politician, councillor in Regent's Park ward, Cabinet Member for Young People in Camden Council and former Mayor of Camden; in 2003, at age 34, became UK's youngest mayor as well as the first Bangladeshi and first Muslim mayor
 Farida Anwar, Labour Party politician, councillor for Headington Hill and Northway in Oxford City Council; in 2014, became Oxfordshire's first city councillor from a Bangladeshi background
Anwar Choudhury, former Governor of the Cayman Islands and High Commissioner of the UK to Bangladesh
 Rabina Khan, Liberal Democrat councillor for Shadwell ward, former Cabinet Member for Housing in Tower Hamlets London Borough Council, community worker and author of Ayesha's Rainbow
 Syeda Khatun MBE, Labour Party politician, councillor for Tipton Green in the Sandwell Metropolitan Borough Council and Cabinet Advisor for Education; in 1999, the first Bangladeshi woman to be elected in the Midlands
 Murad Qureshi, Labour Party politician and former Greater London Assembly member
 Lutfur Rahman, community activist and Independent politician; from 2010 to 2015 the first directly elected mayor of Tower Hamlets and the first Bangladeshi leader of the council
 Luthfur Rahman , current deputy leader of Manchester City Council
 Nadia Shah, Labour Party politician, councillor in Regent's Park ward and former Mayor of Camden; in May 2016, became the first female mayor in the United Kingdom of Bangladeshi origin
 Baroness "Pola" Manzila Uddin, Labour Party life peer, community activist, and the first Muslim and second Asian woman to sit in the House of Lords
 Apsana Begum MP, Labour Party Member of Parliament for Poplar and Limehouse, first Hijabi to be elected as an MP for the British parliament
 Rupa Huq MP, Labour Party Member of Parliament for Ealing Central and Acton constituency, writer, columnist, senior lecturer in Sociology at Kingston University and former Deputy Mayor of the London Borough of Ealing
 Rushanara Ali MP, Labour Party Member of Parliament for Bethnal Green and Bow constituency; first person of Bangladeshi origin to be elected to the House of Commons and one of the first three Muslim women to be elected as a Member of Parliament
 Tulip Siddiq MP, Labour Party Member of Parliament for Hampstead and Kilburn, former councillor for Regent's Park ward and Cabinet Member for Culture and Communities in Camden London Borough Council; in 2010, became the first Bengali female councillor in Camden Council

Canada
 Doly Begum, Bangladeshi-Canadian politician of New Democratic party & MPP from Scarborough Southwest

United States of America
 Raj Mukherji – Majority Whip and Democratic member of the New Jersey General Assembly from New Jersey's 33rd Legislative District covering portions of Hudson County (second Indian American elected to NJ state legislature); former Deputy Mayor of Jersey City, NJ; former Commissioner and Chairman of the Jersey City Housing Authority (then the youngest to serve in that position); Reservist (2001–09) in United States Marine Corps
 Hansen Clarke, Member of the U.S. House of Representatives from Michigan's 13th district, Democrat, Member of the Michigan Senate from the 1st district, Member of the Michigan House of Representatives from the 7th and 16th district

Other

 I'tisam-ud-Din, Mughal diplomat and munshi

Ramon Magsaysay Award

 Tahrunessa Abdullah
 Fazle Hasan Abed KCMG, founder of the world's largest non-governmental organisation, BRAC
 Amitabha Chowdhury
 Zafrullah Chowdhury
 Mahasweta Devi
 Gour Kishore Ghosh
 Angela Gomes
 Syeda Rizwana Hasan, attorney, Hero of the Environment and winner of the Goldman Environmental Prize
 A.H.M. Noman Khan
 Sombhu Mitra
 Matiur Rahman
 Satyajit Ray
 Abdullah Abu Sayeed
 Ravi Shankar
 Muhammad Yunus

Religion and spirituality

Brahmoism

 Charulata Mukherjee, women's rights activist and social worker from Calcutta, associated with Brahmo Samaj and All India Women's Conference
 Ram Mohan Roy, founder of the Brahmo Samaj
 Keshub Chandra Sen
 Debendranath Tagore, social thinker and reformer, founder of the Brahmo Religion or Brahmoism, the youngest religion of India

Buddhism

 Anagarika Munindra (1915–2003), vipassana meditation teacher, taught many notable meditation teachers including Dipa Ma, Joseph Goldstein, Sharon Salzberg, and Surya Das
 Atiśa Dipamkara Shrijnana (982–1054), or Srjnana Atisa Dipanakara, Buddhist scholar, missionary and teacher, inventor of bodhichitta
 Tibbetibaba (died 1930), philosopher saint
 Tilopa (988–1069), Buddhist teacher, important figure in Tibetan Buddhism, founder of the Kagyu lineage and progressor of Mahamudra method

Hinduism

 Swami Abhedananda (Kaliprasad Chandra), monk, author, philosopher, occultist, reformer, founder of the Ramakrishna Vedanta Math
 Advaita Acharya, Vaishnava guru
 Sri Aurobindo, yogi, nationalist, philosopher, author, poet, visionary
 Gaura Kisora dasa Babaji, Vaishnava ascetic, mystic and recluse
 Mahavatar Babaji, yogi and tantrik master
 Bamakhepa (Bamacharan Chattopadhyay), tantrik guru and mystic of Tarapith
 Kamalakanta Bhattacharya, Tantrik/ Shakta saint and master, composer of Shakta devotional songs
 Sri Chinmoy, Indian spiritual master
 Swami Satyananda Giri, Manamohan Mazumder monk, preacher and yogi
 Yukteswar Giri, Priyanath Karar, yogi, educationist, astronomer, and astrologer
 Nolini Kanta Gupta, revolutionary, linguist, scholar, critic, poet, philosopher and mystic, the most senior of Sri Aurobindo's disciples, author of many books
 Gopinath Kaviraj, yogi, philosopher, spiritual master, tantrik scholar and author
 Anandamoyi Ma, mystic, spiritual teacher and Tantrik Guru
 Chaitanya Mahaprabhu, Vaishnava mystic, missionary, monk and social reformer
 Acharya Srimat Swami Pranavanandaji Maharaj, founder Bharat Sevashram Sangha
 Lahiri Mahasaya or Shyama Charan Lahiri, yogi, philosopher, the propagator of Kriya Yogay
 Nirmalananda, 19th century monk
 Nityananda, great avadut mystic, social reformer, chief associate of Chaitanya, reincarnation of Balaram and a primary figure within the Gaudiya Vaishnava tradition of Bengal
 Ramakrishna Paramahamsa (Gadadhar Chattopadhaya), mystic, preacher of Dakshineshwar
 Nigamananda Paramahansa, Saraswat, tantrik guru, vedantic scholar, author, yogi, mystic, philosopher, disciple of Bamakhepa, founder of several institutions
 A.C. Bhaktivedanta Swami Prabhupada (Abhay Charan Dey), Vaishnava missionary and theologian, founder of ISKCON
 Pranavananda, founder of Bharat Sevashram Sangha
 Rani Rashmoni, founder of Dakshineswar Kali Temple, Kolkata
 Bhaktisiddhanta Sarasvati, Vaishnava missionary and theologian, founder of Gaudiya Math
 Prabhat Ranjan Sarkar or Sri Anandamurti, polymathic personality, author, philosopher, socio-political thinker, educationist, revolutionary, poet, composer, linguist, self-development and human welfare theorist, the founder of Ananda Marga (a socio-spiritual movement)
 Ramprasad Sen, tantrik master, mystic, famous as a composer of mystic, devotional songs to Goddess Kali
 Bhaktivinoda Thakur, Vaishnava missionary and theologian
 Swami Vivekananda (Narendranath Datta), monk, missionary and social reformer, founder of the Ramakrishna Math and Ramakrishna Mission
 Paramahansa Yogananda, monk, philosopher, preacher, author and exponent of Kriya Yoga

Islam

 Mearajuddin Ahmad (c. 1890), author of Tufat al-Muslimin
 Muhsinuddin Ahmad (1819–1862), second leader of the Faraizi movement
 Nesaruddin Ahmad (1873–1952), inaugural Pir of Sarsina and founder of Darussunnat Kamil Madrasa
 Nur Qutb Alam (d. 1416), Islamic scholar involved in the Bengal-Jaunpur confrontation and pioneer of the Dobhashi tradition
 Abu Saeed Muhammad Omar Ali (1945–2010), author, teacher and translator 
 Muhammad Ayyub Ali (1919–1995), former principal of Madrasah-e-Alia Dhaka and Sylhet Alia Madrasa
 Ruhul Amin (b. 1962), khatib of Baitul Mukarram National Mosque
 Fazlul Haque Amini (1945–2012), former principal of Jamia Qurania Arabia Lalbagh and politician
 Harun Babunagari (1902–1986), founding principal of Al-Jamiatul Islamiah Azizul Uloom Babunagar
 Junaid Babunagari (1955-2021), former Amir of Hefazat-e-Islam
 Muhibbullah Babunagari (born 1935), current Amir of Hefazat-e-Islam
 Muhammad Abdul Bari (1930–2003), former vice-chancellor of the University of Rajshahi
 Muhammad Abdullahil Baqi (1886–1952), Islamic scholar, writer and politician
 Mushahid Ahmad Bayampuri (1907-1971), scholar and member of 3rd National Assembly of Pakistan
 Ali Sher Bengali (fl. 1570s), Sufi saint of the Shattari order
 Abdul Wahid Bengali (1850-1905), co-founder of Al-Jamiatul Ahlia Darul Ulum Moinul Islam
 Athar Ali Bengali (1891–1976), former president of Nizam-e-Islam Party 
 Muhammad Salih Bengali (fl. 1700s), leading scholar in the fields of fiqh, hikmah, kalam and logic
 Shah Nuri Bengali (died 1785), Sufi scholar and author
 Usman Bengali (died 1570s), Muslim scholar based in Sambhal
 Yusuf Bengali (fl. 1570s), Sufi pir of the Shattari order
 Abdul Hamid Khan Bhashani (1880–1976), founder of the Awami Muslim League and The Daily Ittefaq
 Qazi Mu'tasim Billah (1933–2013), former principal Jamia Shariyyah Malibagh and former professor at the University of Dhaka
 Ashraf Ali Bishwanathi (1928–2005), former president of Jamiat Ulema-e-Islam Bangladesh
 Abdul Halim Bukhari (born 1945), Islamic scholar and chancellor of Al Jamia Al Islamia Patiya
 Fakhr ad-Din al-Burdwani (d. 1785), Islamic scholar of logic and hikmah
 Ghulam Mustafa Burdwani, 18th-century mufti and poet
 Abdur Rahman Chatgami (1920–2015), founder of Islamic Research Center Bangladesh
 Abdus Salam Chatgami (1943–2021), former Grand Mufti in both Pakistan and Bangladesh
 Ibrahim Chatuli (1894-1984), Education Minister of Assam and former Member of Parliament in Pakistan and Bangladesh
 Abdul Jalil Choudhury (1925-1989), Islamic scholar and former MLA of Badarpur and Algapur
 Abdul Matin Chowdhury (1915–1990), Shaykh of Fulbari and political activist
 Farid Uddin Chowdhury (born 1947), principal of Shahjalal Jamia School
 Najib Ali Choudhury (c. 1870), founder of the Madinatul Uloom Bagbari in South Assam
 Izharul Islam Chowdhury, founder of Jamiatul Uloom Al-Islamia Lalkhan Bazar
 Shahinur Pasha Chowdhury, vice-president of Jamiat Ulema-e-Islam
 Ahmed Ali Enayetpuri (1898–1959), founder of Sariat-i-Islam newspaper
 Khwaja Yunus Ali Enayetpuri (1886–1951), founder of the Enayetpuri Sufi Darbar
 Muhammad Faizullah (1892–1976), former teacher at Al-Jamiatul Ahlia Darul Ulum Moinul Islam
 Abdul Haque Faridi (1903–1996), founder of the Islami Bishwakosh project
 Shamsul Haque Faridpuri (1896–1969), founder of the Jamia Qurania Arabia Lalbagh
 Nurul Islam Farooqi (died 2014), TV presenter assassinated by Islamic militants
 Abdul Latif Chowdhury Fultali (1913–2008), founder of the Fultali movement and Darul Hadis Latifiah
 Muhammad Asadullah Al-Ghalib (born 1948), reformist and founder of Ahle Hadith Andolon Bangladesh
 Nur Uddin Gohorpuri (1924–2005), chairman of Befaqul Madarisil Arabia Bangladesh	
 Tafazzul Haque Habiganji (1938–2020), former vice-president of Hefazat-e-Islam and Jamiat Ulema-e-Islam
 Abdul Malek Halim, founder of Al-Jamiatul Arabia Haildhar Madrasa
 Obaidullah Hamzah (born 1972), current principal of Al Jamia Al Islamia Patiya
 Alaul Haq (1301-1398), Islamic scholar entrusted with the Bengal Sultanate treasury
 Ubaidul Haq (1928–2007), former khatib of Baitul Mukarram
 Azizul Haq (1903–1961), founder of Al Jamia Al Islamia Patiya
 Azizul Haque (1919–2012), first translator of Sahih Al-Bukhari into the Bengali language
 Mahfuzul Haque (born 1969), Islamic scholar and politician
 Mamunul Haque (born 1973), Islamic scholar and influential speaker
 Shah Ahmad Hasan (1882–1967), founder of Jiri Madrasa
 A F M Khalid Hossain (born 1959), vice-president of Hefazat-e-Islam Bangladesh
 Sayed Moazzem Hossain (1901–1991), former vice-chancellor of the University of Dhaka 
 Zohurul Hoque (1926–2017), translator of the Qur'an 
 Hafezzi Huzur (1895–1997), founder of the Bangladesh Khilafat Andolan
 Abdul Momin Imambari (1930–2020), former president of Jamiat Ulema-e-Islam Bangladesh
 Syed Muhammad Ishaq (1915–1977), founder of the Chormonai Darbar Sharif and Jamia Rashidia Ahsanabad
 Shahidul Islam (born 1960), founder of al-Markaz al-Islami
 Maniruzzaman Islamabadi (1875–1950), journalist and founder of the Anjuman-i-Ulama-i-Bangala
 Abdul Jabbar Jahanabadi (1937–2016), former secretary-general of Befaqul Madarisil Arabia Bangladesh
 Khandaker Abdullah Jahangir (1961–2016), professor at Islamic University, Bangladesh
 Abul Hasan Jashori (1918–1993), freedom fighter and founding principal of Jamia Ejazia Darul Uloom Jessore
 Nurul Islam Jihadi (born 1948), secretary-general of Hefazat-e-Islam
 Syed Faizul Karim (born 1973), senior vice-president of Islami Andolan
 Syed Fazlul Karim (1935–2006), former Pir of Chormonai and founder of Islami Andolan
 Syed Rezaul Karim (born 1971), current Pir of Chormonai and leader of Islami Andolan
 Nur Hossain Kasemi (1945–2020), former secretary-general of Hefazat-e-Islam
 Deen Muhammad Khan (1900–1974), co-founder of Jamia Qurania Arabia Lalbagh
 Mohammad Akram Khan (1868–1969), founder of The Azad
 Muhiuddin Khan (1935–2016), translator of the Qur'an and the Ma'ariful Qur'an exegesis
 Abdul Hamid Madarshahi (1869–1920), co-founder of Darul Uloom Hathazari
 Ghulamur Rahman Maizbhandari (1865–1937), 2nd Pir of Maizbhandari
 Syed Ahmadullah Maizbhandari (1826–1906), founder of the Maizbhandari Darbar
 Muhammad Abdul Malek (born 1969), muhaddith and author
 Maqsudullah (1883–1961), Deobandi scholar and Pir of Talgachhia Darbar Sharif
 Ajmal Masroor (born 1971), British politician, imam and TV presenter
 Abu Taher Misbah (born 1956), academic, author and founder of Madani Nesab
 Abdur Rahim Muhammadpuri (1859–1931), Islamic writer
 Mohammad Meherullah (1861–1907), comparative religionist writer
 Abdul Khaleque Mondal (born 1944), Jamaat-e-Islami politician and principal of Agardari Madrasa
 Mawlana Murad, lived in Mecca in the 1700s
 Sultan Zauq Nadvi (born 1939), founder of Jamia Darul Ma'arif Al-Islamia
 Shah Sultan Ahmad Nanupuri (1914–1997), founding principal of Al-Jamiah Al-Islamiah Obaidia Nanupur
 Saifur Rahman Nizami (born 1916), Ekushey Padak recipient
 Shamsul Huda Panchbagi (1897-1988), founder of the Emarat Party and two-time member of the Bengal Legislative Assembly 
 Abdul Wahhab Pirji (1890-1976), scholar, educationist and founding principal of Jamia Hussainia Ashraful Uloom, Bara Katara
 Shamsuddin Qasemi (1935-1996), former secretary-general of Jamiat Ulema-e-Islam
 Abdul Qayum (born 1960), Chief Imam of the East London Mosque
 Habibullah Qurayshi (1865-1934), co-founder of Al-Jamiatul Ahlia Darul Ulum Moinul Islam
 Abdur Rahim (1918–1987), first leader of the Bangladesh Jamaat-e-Islami
 Sajidur Rahman (b. 1964), vice-president of Befaqul Madarisil Arabia Bangladesh
 Shah Waliur Rahman (1916—2006), Islamic scholar and female education activist
 Abu Zafar Mohammad Saleh (1915–1990), Independence Award recipient
 Muhammad Shahidullah (1885–1969), essayist and editor of the Islami Bishwakosh
 Haji Shariatullah (1781–1840), founder of the Faraizi movement
 Mohammad Abu Bakr Siddique (1865–1943), inaugural Pir of Furfura Sharif
 Uthman Sirajuddin (1258–1357), Court Scholar of Bengal under the Ilyas Shahis
 Delwar Hossain Sayeedi (born 1940), Islamic scholar and former member of Bangladeshi parliament
 Shah Ahmad Shafi (1916–2020), former Amir of Hefazat-e-Islam
 Ibrahim Ali Tashna (1872–1931), Islamic scholar, poet and activist
 Zia Uddin (born 1941), president of Jamiat Ulema-e-Islam Bangladesh
 Ibrahim Ujani (1863–1943), Qur'an reciter and founder of Jamia Islamia Ibrahimia
 Shah Abd al-Wahhab (1894-1982), second principal of Darul Uloom Hathazari
 Muhammad Wakkas (1952–2021), former secretary-general of Jamiat Ulema-e-Islam
 Nurul Islam Walipuri (born 1955), mufassir, teacher and author
 Obaidul Haque Wazirpuri (1934–2008), former co-president of Befaqul Madarisil Arabia Bangladesh
 Abul Kalam Muhammad Yusuf (1926–2014), former chairman of Darul-Arabia wa Darul-Ifta Bangladesh
 Sayed Kamaluddin Zafree (born 1945), founder of the Bangladesh Islami University
 Abubakar Muhammad Zakaria (born 1969), professor at Islamic University, Bangladesh
 Shaikh Zamiruddin (1870–1937), writer and revert to Islam

Christianity

 Kali Charan Banerjee, lawyer and theologian, founder of the Calcutta Christo Samaj, member of the Indian National Congress
 Krishna Mohan Banerjee, Bengali philosopher and litterateur, President of the Bengal Christian Association
 Puroshottam Choudhary, preacher, evangelist, writer of Christian literature
 Lal Behari Dey, Indian journalist, writer, and Christian missionary
 Patrick D'Rozario, first Bangladeshi Cardinal, Archbishop of Dhaka
 Aurobindo Nath Mukherjee, first Indian Bishop of Calcutta and Metropolitan of India
 Krishna Pal, Bengali evangelist and missionary, first Bengali convert to Christianity under William Carey

Other
 Ipsita Roy Chakraverti

Freedom Fighters and Revolutionaries

 Alimuddin Ahmad (1884-1920)
 Rajab Ali Khan
 Sri Aurobindo
 Surendranath Banerjee
 Abul Barkat
 Benoy Basu
 Basanta Kumar Biswas
 Womesh Chandra Bonnerjee
 Khudiram Bose
 Netaji Subhas Chandra Bose
 Rash Behari Bose
 Sarat Chandra Bose
 Prafulla Chaki
 Ambika Chakrobarty
 Panchanan Chakraborty
 Amarendranath Chatterjee
 Jogesh Chandra Chattopadhyay
 Virendranath Chattopadhyaya
 Bina Das
 Chittaranjan Das
 Jatindra Nath Das
 Bhupendra Kumar Datta
 Batukeshwar Dutt
 Bipin Behari Ganguli
 Dwarkanath Ganguly
 Barindra Kumar Ghosh
 Dinesh Gupta
 Badal Gupta
 Matangini Hazra
 Kazi Nazrul Islam
 Bagha Jatin
 Hemchandra Kanungo
 Syama Prasad Mookerjee
 Jatindranath Mukherjee
 Saroj Mukherjee
 Sarojini Naidu
 Bipin Chandra Pal
 Sudhamoy Pramanick
 Renuka Ray
 B. C. Roy
 Birendranath Sasmal
 Narendra Mohan Sen
 Surya Sen
 Triguna Sen
 Huseyn Shaheed Suhrawardy
 Titumir
 Pritilata Waddedar

Science and technology

Physicists

 Ahsan Ali, doctor, physician and researcher
 Kedareswar Banerjee, first crystallographer of India, known for X-ray Crystallography and was director of the Indian Association for the Cultivation of Science, Kolkata. The K. Banerjee Centre of Atmospheric and Ocean Studies was established in his honour
 Srikumar Banerjee, director of BARC and AECI
 Mani Lal Bhaumik, physicist, helped develop the first excimer laser at the University of California
 Debendra Mohan Bose, physicist, made contributions in the field of cosmic rays, artificial radioactivity and neutron physics
 Jagadish Chandra Bose, physicist, radio and wireless transmission pioneer, also did substantial work on botany
 Satyendra Nath Bose, physicist, founded Bose–Einstein statistics, which helped to produce Bose–Einstein condensate (2001 Nobel Prize in Physics was given for this discovery); the Boson, an elementary particle named after him
 Swapan Chattopadhyay, particle accelerator physicist, contributed to the development of many accelerators around the world, e.g. the Super Proton-Antiproton Synchrotron, the Large Hadron Collider at CERN, and the Advanced Light Source at Berkeley
 Swapan Kumar Gain, Bengali-American physicist, Professor of Physics at the City University of New York
 Amitabha Ghosh, only Asian on NASA's Mars Pathfinder mission
 Dipan Ghosh, theoretical physicist, known for Majumdar–Ghosh model
 Hiranmay Sen Gupta, physicist, has published around 200 research papers in various international journals
 M. Zahid Hasan, physicist, Eugene Higgins endowed chair professor of quantum physics at Princeton University and scientist at Lawrence Berkeley National Laboratory, known for discoveries in quantum matter and topology
 Mohammad Ataul Karim, known for contributions to the fields of electro-optical devices and systems, optical computing and processing, and pattern recognition
 Ashesh Prasad Mitra, performed major work in the field of the Earth's near-space environment, through group based and space techniques
 Sisir Kumar Mitra, physicist, pioneer in the investigations of ionosphere, the Mitra crater on the Moon is named after him
 Bedabrata Pain, co-inventor of CMOS image sensor, also an award-winning filmmaker
 Amal Kumar Raychaudhuri, physicist, known for his contributions to relativity and cosmology including Raychaudhuri's equation
 Somak Raychaudhury, astrophysicist and observational cosmologist, Director, Inter-University Centre for Astronomy and Astrophysics
 Subrata Roy, known for his contributions in the modelling of plasma physics and the invention of the Wingless Electromagnetic Air Vehicle and serpentine geometry plasma actuator
 Meghnad Saha, physicist, produced the Thermo-Ionization Equation or Saha Equation
 Ashoke Sen, physicist, known for his contributions to string theory, co-discovered S-duality
 Bikash Sinha, former director of SINP and Padmabhusan awardee

Biologists

 Maqsudul Alam, scientist and professor, achieved four milestones in genomics - sequencing the genomes of papaya, rubber plants, jute and fungus
 Gopal Chandra Bhattacharya, known for his pioneering work on social insects and the role of bacteria in metamorphosis
 Sharmila Bhattacharya, head of the Biomodel Performance and Behavior laboratory at NASA Ames Research Center
 Ananda Mohan Chakrabarty, most notable for his work in directed evolution and his role in developing a genetically engineered organism using plasmid transfer while working at GE
 Maharani Chakravorty, organized the first laboratory course on recombinant DNA techniques in Asia and Far East in 1981
 Abed Chaudhury, Bangladeshi-Australian geneticist and science writer
 Biraja Sankar Guha, first director of Anthropological Survey of India
 Jahangir Alam Khan, agricultural economist and researcher
 Dilip Mahalanabis, biologist, under his leadership the International Centre for Diarrhoeal Disease Research (Bangladesh medical centre), discovered oral rehydration therapy, which has saved more than 40 million lives from diarrhea
 Swadhin Kumar Mandal, Alexander von Humboldt Fellow and Shanti Swaroop Bhatnagar Award winner
 Panchanan Mitra, first professor of anthropology in India, among the first Indians to study at Yale University
 Mohammad Hossain Mondol, director-general of Bangladesh Agricultural Research Institute 
 Sarat Chandra Roy, widely regarded as the father of Indian ethnography, the first Indian ethnographer, and as the first Indian anthropologist
 Ram Brahma Sanyal, pioneer in captive breeding; one of the first zookeepers trained as a biologist; a corresponding member of the Zoological Society of London
 Dwijen Sharma, naturalist and science writer

Geologists

 Pramatha Nath Bose, one of the early Indians to join Geological Survey of India
 Nibir Mandal, known for studies on the evolution of geological structures, Shanti Swaroop Bhatnagar Award winner
 Sudipta Sengupta, Indian geologist and one of the first Indian Women to set foot on Antarctica
 M. A. Zaher, director-general of the Geological Survey of Bangladesh

Chemists

 Sadhan Basu, Palit professor at Calcutta University and Bhatnagar Award, CV Raman recipient
 Asima Chatterjee, known for her work in the fields of organic chemistry and phytomedicine; her most notable work includes those on vinca alkaloids, and the development of anti-epileptic and anti-malarial drugs
 Jnan Chandra Ghosh, chemist, known for anomaly of strong electrolytes
 Abul Hussam, chemist, inventor of Sono arsenic filter and the gold winner of the 2007 Grainger Challenge Prize for Sustainability
 Abdus Suttar Khan, chemist, inventor of alloys for use in commercial jets, U.S. fighter planes, gas turbines, train engines, and space shuttles
 Nurul Haque Miah, chemist, former professor at Dhaka College, textbook author
 Jnanendra Nath Mukherjee, chemist, specialised in the fields of electrochemistry, colloids and soil science
 Prafulla Chandra Roy, pioneer in the field of pharmaceutical and chemical works (discovered mercurous nitrite), The Royal Society of Chemistry honoured him with the first ever Chemical Landmark Plaque outside Europe, founder of Bengal Chemicals & Pharmaceuticals, India's first pharmaceutical company

Doctors and physicians

 Shamsuddin Ahmed, medical doctor martyred in the Bangladesh Liberation War
 Rafiuddin Ahmed, dentist, founder of the first dental college of India and Bengal Dental Association, which later became Indian Dental Association
Syed Modasser Ali, ophthalmic surgeon and a health advisor to Sheikh Hasina,  founder of Mojibunnessa Eye Hospital and editor-in-chief of the Bangladesh Ophthalmic Journal.
 Upendranath Brahmachari, synthesized Urea Stibamine (carbostibamide) and used it in the treatment of Kala-azar (leishmaniasis), was a nominee for the Nobel Prize in Physiology or Medicine
 Surjo Kumar Chakraborty, India's first graduate in medicine
 Kadambini Ganguly, one of the first two Indian women who trained in Western medicine
 Jogesh Chandra Ghosh, pioneer of modern Ayurvedic medicine
 Sake Dean Mahomed, surgeon and entrepreneur
 Siddhartha Mukherjee, physician, scientist and writer, author of The Emperor of All Maladies: A Biography of Cancer, which won the Pulitzer Prize for General Non-Fiction in 2011
 Subhash Mukhopadhyay, physician, first physician in India and second in the world to perform in vitro fertilization
 Shuvo Roy, scientist and inventor of implantable artificial kidney
 Mahendralal Sarkar, homeopath and founder of the Indian Association for the Cultivation of Science
 Hassan Suhrawardy, second Muslim from the sub-continent to become a Fellow of the Royal College of Surgeons of England

Mathematicians

 Debabrata Basu, mathematician, found Basu's theorem
 Anil Kumar Bhattacharya, known for Bhattacharya coefficient, and the Bhattacharya distance
 Raj Chandra Bose, mathematician, known for Association scheme, Bose–Mesner algebra, Euler's conjecture
 Sourav Chatterjee, mathematician, specializing in mathematical statistics and probability theory. Professor at Stanford
 Anil Kumar Gain, mathematician and statistician from University of Cambridge, Fellow of the Royal Society
 Jayanta Kumar Ghosh, mathematician, known for Bahadur-Ghosh-Kiefer representation and Ghosh-Pratt identity
 Anadi Sankar Gupta, specialised in fluid dynamics and magnetohydrodynamics, notably on heat transfer in free convection flow in the presence of magnetic field
 Qazi Azizul Haque, pioneered the mathematical formula for Henry Classification System of fingerprinting
 Khandkar Manwar Hossain, Bangladeshi statistician
 Prasanta Chandra Mahalanobis, founder Indian Statistical Institute, best remembered for the Mahalanobis distance, a statistical measure
 Samarendra Kumar Mitra, designed, developed and constructed India's first indigenous computer (an electronic analog computer) in ISI in 1953
 Syamadas Mukhopadhyaya, introduced the four-vertex theorem and Mukhopadhyaya's theorem in plane geometry
 ANM Muniruzzaman, Bangladeshi statistician killed in Bangladesh Liberation War
 Ritabrata Munshi, mathematician specialising in number theory. Graduate student of Andrew Wiles.
 Dijen K. Ray-Chaudhuri, professor emeritus at Ohio State University. Known for BCH code
 Samarendra Nath Roy, mathematician, known for multivariate analysis
 Sucharit Sarkar, Indian topologist and IMO gold medallist
 Radhanath Sikdar, mathematician, calculated the height of Mount Everest

Technologists

 Shubham Banerjee, inventor of Braigo; at 12 years old (2014) became the youngest entrepreneur to receive venture capital funding
 Shuman Ghosemajumder, co-founder of TeachAids, former click fraud czar at Google
 Jawed Karim, co-founder of YouTube, early employee of PayPal
 Samarendra Kumar Mitra, designed, developed and constructed, in 1953, India's first indigenous computer (an electronic analog computer)

Architects, archaeologists and engineers

 Jalal Ahmad (born 1959), president of the Institute of Architects Bangladesh, vice-president of the Commonwealth Association of Architects
 Sultanuddin Ahmed, engineer martyred during the Bangladesh Liberation War 
 Vidyadhar Bhattacharya (1693–1751), the chief architect and city planner of Jaipur, Rajasthan; with Sir Samuel Swinton Jacob, he is credited as the architect of City Palace, Jaipur
 Fazlur Rahman Khan (1929–1982), structural engineer and architect, father of tubular designs for high-rises such as Willis Tower (aka Sears Tower) and the John Hancock Center
 Saiman Miah (born 1986), architectural and graphic designer, designed one of the two £5 commemorative coins for the 2012 Summer Olympics.
 M Harunur Rashid, archaeologist, educationist and museum curator
 Abul Kalam Mohammed Zakaria, archaeologist

Social reformers and position holders

 Fazle Hasan Abed KCMG, founder of the world's largest non-governmental organisation, BRAC
 Syed Ameer Ali, law reformer
 Rawshan Ara Bachchu, woman rights activist and part of the Bengali language movement
 Kalyan Banerjee, former president of Rotary International
 Syeda Shahar Banu, woman rights activist and part of the Bengali language movement
 The Honourable Doctor Muhammad Abdul Bari MBE DL FRSA Esq., former secretary of Muslim Aid, former secretary-general of the Muslim Council of Britain, former president of the Islamic Forum of Europe and former chairman of the East London Mosque
 Khuda Buksh, pioneer of life insurance in Bangladesh
 Malati Choudhury, Indian civil rights activist, freedom activist and Gandhian
 Chowdhury Mueen-Uddin, director of Muslim spiritual care provision at the National Health Service, founder of the Islamic Forum of Europe and former chairman of Muslim Aid
 Zobeda Khanom Chowdhury, woman rights activist and part of the Bengali language movement
 Anil Kumar Gain, founder of Vidyasagar University and President of the Indian Science Congress
 Sir Azizul Haque, lawyer, writer, educator and public servant
 Roquia Sakhawat Hussain, prolific writer, important women's rights activist and social worker, early feminist science fiction writer
 Nasreen Pervin Huq, women's rights activist
 Sayeed Iskander, founding chairman of Islamic TV and former army major of Bangladesh
 Irene Khan, former Secretary General of Amnesty International, first woman, first Asian, and first Muslim to hold the position
 Osman Ghani Khan, former chairman of the United Nations Board of Auditors, first Bangladeshi to hold a UN post.
 Taiyaba Majumder, recipient of the Begum Rokeya Padak for contributions to women's rights and economic development
 Muhammad Mohsin, philanthropist and founder of Hooghly Mohsin College
 Mohua Mukherjee, social activist and author
 Audri Mukhopadhyay, diplomat and economist
 Renuka Ray, freedom fighter and social activist
 Bunker Roy, social activist and educator who founded the Barefoot College, selected as one of Time's 100 most influential personalities in 2010
 Manabendra Nath Roy, pioneer Indian Bengali revolutionary philosopher, founder of the Mexican Communist Party and the Indian Communist Party
 Harichand Thakur, founder of Matua Mahasangha
 Binay Ranjan Sen, former Director General of the Food and Agriculture Organization
 Keshub Chunder Sen, intellectual, religious reformer
 Muhammad Shahidullah, educationist, writer, polyglot, philologist and linguist
 Romola Sinha, women's rights and social activist, founder member of All Bengal Women's Union
 Ishwar Chandra Vidyasagar, responsible for introducing major reforms in the educational system and women's rights activist

Sports

Administrators
Sourav Ganguly, President of Board of Control for Cricket in India and former Indian cricket team captain, Padma Shri awardee

Athletics

 Mohamed Mahbub Alam, South Asian Games gold medalist sprinter
 Swapna Barman, heptathlon athlete
 Soma Biswas, heptathlon athlete
 Shanta Ghosh, retired German sprinter who specialized in the 400 meters
 Mohan Khan, Olympic sprinter
 Beauty Nazmun Nahar, Olympic sprinter from Bangladesh
 Hari Shankar Roy, Indian track and field athlete
 Saraswati Saha, Indian former track and field sprinter
 Jyotirmoyee Sikdar, athletics, double gold-medallist in track at Asian games, recipient of Rajiv Gandhi Khel Ratna award and Padma Shri award

Archery

 Dola Banerjee, Indian female archer
 Rahul Banerjee, Indian archer
 Krishna Das, former Indian archer
 Ruman Shana, Bangladeshi archer, won gold in SA games 2019
 Jayanta Talukdar, archer

Badminton

 Dipu Ghosh, former badminton player
 Raman Ghosh, former badminton player
 Manoj Sarkar, para badminton player and Bronze Medalist at the 2020 Paralympic Games, Tokyo

Bodybuilding, boxing, rugby and wrestling

 Manohar Aich, bodybuilder
 Tameer Anwar, bodybuilder, Mister Bangladesh
 Laxman Das, wrestler and weight lifter
 Sukhen Dey, weightlifter
 Ambika Charan Guha, Indian wrestler who pioneered the growth of Akhada culture in Bengal
 Gobar Guha, Indian wrestler and practitioner of Pehlwani
 Bulbul Hussain, wheelchair rugby player for Kent Crusaders and the Great Britain Paralympic team
 Abdul Ali Jacko, two-time world lightweight kick-boxing champion
 Mohammed Ali Qamar, Indian boxer
 Reba Rakshit, Indian female bodybuilder and exponent of yoga
 Monotosh Roy, Indian bodybuilder, first Asian to be awarded the Mr. Universe title
 Paresh Lal Roy, known as the "father of Indian boxing"
 Asit Kumar Saha, wrestler and wrestling coach
 Sudhir Saha, wrestler, coach and wrestling administrator in India, introduced Greco-Roman wrestling in India

Chess

 Dibyendu Barua, Indian chess grandmaster
 Surya Shekhar Ganguly, Indian grandmaster
 Rani Hamid, awarded the FIDE Woman International Master (WIM) title in 1985
 Enamul Hossain, Bangladeshi grandmaster
 Niaz Morshed, chess player from Bangladesh, first chess grandmaster to emerge from South Asia
 Ziaur Rahman, Bangladeshi grandmaster
 Mollah Abdullah Al Rakib, Bangladeshi grandmaster

Cricket

 Aftab Ahmed, former Bangladeshi cricketer
 Nasum Ahmed, bowler for Bangladesh
 Taskin Ahmed, Bangladeshi bowler
 Mohammad Ashraful, Bangladeshi cricketer, youngest centurion in test cricket
 Tapash Baishya, Bangladeshi cricketer
 Vikram Banerjee, English cricketer
 Gargi Banerji, former Indian Women cricketer, holds international records
 Habibul Bashar, former Bangladeshi cricketer
 Gopal Bose, former Indian ODI player
 Ranadeb Bose, Indian cricketer
 Utpal Chatterjee, former Indian cricketer
 Nirode Chowdhury, former Indian Test cricketer and pace bowler
 Liton Das, Bangladeshi cricketer
 Deep Dasgupta, former Indian national cricket team wicket-keeper
 Rumeli Dhar, cricketer, Indian women's cricket team
 Ashok Dinda, Indian cricket team player
 Nikhil Dutta, Canadian cricketer
 Sourav Ganguly, former Indian cricket team captain, Padma Shri awardee
 Dhiman Ghosh, Bangladeshi cricketer
 Pinak Ghosh, Bangladeshi cricketer
 Jhulan Goswami, Indian woman cricketer, awarded ICC Women's Cricketer of the Year 2007
 Isa Guha, English women's team cricketer
 Subrata Guha, former Indian Test cricketer
 Mominul Haque, Bangladeshi cricketer, has the highest test batting average and century by a Bangladeshi batsman
 Shakib Al Hasan, Bangladeshi cricketer
 Shuvagata Hom, Bangladeshi cricketer
 Rubel Hossain, Bangladeshi cricketer
 Shahadat Hossain, Bangladeshi cricketer
 Tamim Iqbal, Bangladeshi cricketer
 Taijul Islam, Bangladeshi bowler
 Mustafa Kamal, former president of Bangladesh Cricket Board
 Alok Kapali, former Bangladeshi cricketer
 Kamal Hasan Mondal, Indian cricketer
 Lata Mondal, Bangladeshi woman cricketer
 Saradindu Mukherjee, former Indian cricketer
 Mithu Mukherjee, former Indian women's cricket team player
 Nazmul Hassan Papon, president of Bangladesh Cricket Board
 Mushfiqur Rahim, Bangladeshi cricketer
 Arafat Rahman, former Chairman of the Development Committee of Bangladesh Cricket Board
 Mahmudullah Riyad, Bangladeshi cricketer
 Pankaj Roy, former Indian cricket captain, known for establishing the world record opening partnership of 413 runs against New Zealand
 Pranab Roy, former Test cricketer for India Championship (1983, 1985, 1989)
 Priyanka Roy, former cricketer of Indian women's cricket team
 Subashis Roy, Bangladeshi cricketer
 Wriddhiman Saha, Indian cricket player
 Soumya Sarkar, Bangladeshi cricketer
 Probir Sen, former Indian Test cricketer/wicket-keeper
 Rony Talukdar, Bangladeshi cricketer

Football

 Alfaz Ahmed, former footballer for Bangladesh
 Pradip Kumar Banerjee, footballer, named Indian Footballer of the 20th Century by FIFA
 Prasun Banerjee, former Indian national football player, Arjuna award winner
 Samar Banerjee, Indian footballer, Captain of Indian team in 1956 Olympic
 Sibdas Bhaduri, captained Mohun Bagan in the historic 1911 IFA Shield Final, where they defeated the East Yorkshire Regiment, 2-1
 Arindam Bhattacharya, Indian national football player
 Karuna Bhattacharya, Indian footballer, member of 1938 Australia touring side
 Lal Kamal Bhowmik, Indian footballer
 Subhash Bhowmick, former Indian international football player
 Subhasish Bose, Indian national football player
 Ashok Chatterjee, Indian footballer
 Sudip Chatterjee, footballer, considered among the finest in Indian football, declared AIFF player of the decade in 1994
 Hamza Choudhury, midfielder for English football club Leicester City F.C.
 Yeamin Chowdhury, footballer for Chittagong Abahani
 Narayan Das, Indian national football player
 Krishanu Dey, footballer, known as the "Indian Maradona"
 Robin Dutt, former manager of Bundesliga club Werder Bremen, current representative for sport of VfB Stuttgart
 Chuni Goswami, former Indian Footballer, Padma Shri awardee, awarded the best striker of Asia in 1962
 Pronay Halder, Indian national football player
 Kaiser Hamid, former footballer for Mohammedan S.C.
 Mehtab Hossain, former Indian national football player
 Pritam Kotal, Indian national football player
 Sailen Manna, footballer, the only Asian footballer ever to be named among the 10 best captains in the world by the English FA in 1953
 Arnab Mondal, Indian national football player
 Deepak Kumar Mondal, footballer and Arjuna award winner
 Habibur Rehman Mondal, Indian professional footballer
 Jafar Mondal, goalkeeper for Churchill Brothers FC
 Monirul Mondal, striker for Mohammedan SC
 Syed Rahim Nabi, Indian international footballer, known as 'Mr. Versatile' for his ability to play at any position (except goalkeeper), declared Indian player of the year in 2012
 Santosh Nandy, Indian footballer, Olympian
 Gostha Pal, footballer; member of the 1st Indian team, Mohun Bagan, that won the IFA shield against a British team in the pre-independence period
 Subrata Paul, Indian national football player, first Indian goalkeeper to play professionally for a foreign club in 1st division
 Mahbubur Rahman, footballer and captain of Arambagh KS
 Mohammed Salim, first Indian footballer to play overseas (in 1936 for the Scottish Club Celtic F.C.)
 Sukumar Samajpati, Indian footballer, 1964 Asian Cup team member
 Gautam Sarkar, ex-footballer, having represented SC East Bengal
 Jewel Raja Shaikh, Indian national football player
 Shamit Shome, first Bengali origin player in Major League Soccer
 Neil Taylor, Welsh footballer of half-Bengali origin
 Runu Guha Thakurta, Indian footballer, Olympian
 Anwar Uddin, former defender for West Ham United and founder of Sporting Bengal United F.C.

Golf and snooker

 Anirban Lahiri
 Hammad Miah, professional snooker player
 Siddikur Rahman, Olympic and Asian Tour golfer of Bangladesh

Gymnastics
 Mabia Akhter, Commonwealth gold medalist, South Asian Games gold medalist
 Dipa Karmakar, first Indian woman gymnast to qualify for the Olympics
 Margarita Mamun, Russian gymnast of half-Bangladeshi origin
 Pranati Nayak, second Indian women gymnast to qualify for the Olympics

Cycling and mountaineering

 Ramnath Biswas, soldier and writer best known for circumnavigating the globe by bicycle.
 Chhanda Gain
 Musa Ibrahim, first Bangladeshi to scale Mount Everest
 Nishat Majumdar, first Bangladeshi woman to scale Mount Everest
 Asim Mukhopadhyay
 Wasfia Nazreen, second Bangladeshi woman to scale Mount Everest
 Akke Rahman, first British Muslim/Bengali to scale Mount Everest

Squash

 Ritwik Bhattacharya
 Saurav Ghosal, highest ranked Indian player

Swimming

 Masudur Rahman Baidya, world's first physically handicapped swimmer to swim across the English Channel in 1997 and the Strait of Gibraltar in 2001
 Bula Choudhury, first woman to cross the seven seas
 Brojen Das, first Asian to swim across the English Channel and the first person to cross it four times
 Prasanta Karmakar, para-swimmer
 Sachin Nag, former swimming champion
 Arati Saha, first Indian and Asian woman to swim across English Channel; first Indian female sportsperson to be awarded the Padma Shri
 Mihir Sen, first Indian to swim across the English Channel, from Dover to Calais in 1958, and for swimming across five channels in one calendar year (1956)

Table tennis

 Ankita Das, Olympian
 Mouma Das, Olympian
 Poulomi Ghatak
 Soumyajit Ghosh, Olympian
 Zobera Rahman Linu, Guinness World Record holder
 Subhajit Saha

Tennis

 Samir Banerjee, Winner of the 2021 Wimbledon Championships – Boys' singles title
 Shibu Lal, Bangladeshi ATP player
 Jaidip Mukerjea, Arjuna award winner
 Leander Paes, Olympic Medalist
 Afrana Islam Prity, Bangladeshi ITF player

Writers

 Ekramuddin Ahmad (1872–1940), Bengali litterateur and government officer
 Muhammad Reazuddin Ahmad (1861–1933), journalist and philosopher
 Humayun Ahmed (born 1948), novelist
 Ismail Alam (1868-1937), Urdu poet and activist
 Alaol (1607–1680), poet of medieval era
 Muhammad Asadullah Al-Ghalib (born 1948), Islamic scholar, writer, academic, essayist
 Afzal Ali, 16th-century poet
 Arjumand Ali (1870-1914), first Bengali Muslim novelist
 Asaddor Ali, writer, folklorist and winner of Bangla Academy Literary Award
 Ekram Ali (born 1950), poet
 Monica Ali (born 1967), novelist
 Sadeq Ali, poet best known for the Halat-un-Nabi puthi
 Syed Mujtaba Ali (1904–1974), novelist and essayist
 Syed Murtaza Ali, writer and historian
 Muhammad Arshad, 16th-century Persian writer  * Anuj Dhar, author, journalist
 Banaphool (1899–1979), writer of short stories
 Samit Basu, (1979), author, filmmaker  
 Bibhutibhushan Bandopadhyay (1894–1950), novelist
 Manik Bandopadhyay (1908–1956), novelist and short story writer
 Tarashankar Bandopadhyay (1898–1971), novelist
 Subimal Basak, fiction writer
 Abul Bashar (born 1951), novelist and essayist
 Samit Basu (born 1979), novelist
 Rokeya Begum (1880–1932), author and political activist
 Izzatullah Bengali, 18th-century Persian author
 Sukanta Bhattacharya (1926–1947), poet and playwright
 Abdul Karim Sahitya Bisharad (1871–1953), author, Gorokho Bijoy
 Buddhadeb Bose (1908–1974), poet and essayist
 Sasthi Brata, (1939–2015), fiction writer, based in UK
 Novoneel Chakraborty, author, scriptwriter
 Nirendranath Chakravarty (1924–2018), poet
 Chandidas (1408–?), medieval Bengali poet
 Aroup Chatterjee (born 1958), British Indian atheist physician, author of Mother Teresa: The Untold Story
 Rimi B. Chatterjee, novelist and short story writer, winner of the 2007 SHARP deLong Prize
 Upamanyu Chatterjee (born 1959), author and administrator
 Pritish Nandy (born 1951), poet and author and journalist EM Forster Literary Award, Padma Shri
 Suniti Kumar Chatterji (1890–1977), linguist and educator
 Bankim Chandra Chattopadhyay (1838–1894), novelist, essayist, penned the Indian national song of integrity "Vande Mataram"
 Sandipan Chattopadhyay (1933–2005), novelist
 Sanjeev Chattopadhyay, (born 1936), fiction writer
 Sarat Chandra Chattopadhyay (1876–1938), novelist
 Shakti Chattopadhyay, (1933–1995) poet
 Karimunnesa Khanam Chaudhurani (1855–1926), poet and social worker
 Amit Chaudhuri (born 1962), Professor of Contemporary Literature at the University of East Anglia, 2002 Sahitya Akademi Award winner
 Nirad C. Chaudhuri (1897–1999), essayist and scholar
 Pramatha Chaudhuri (1868–1946), editor of Sabuj Patra, wrote in the era of Rabindranath Tagore
 Abdur Rouf Choudhury, writer
 Achyut Charan Choudhury, writer and historian
 Malay Roy Choudhury (born 1939), Bengali poet and novelist who founded the "Hungryalist Movement" in the 1960s
 Chowdhury Gulam Akbar, writer and collector of Bengali folk literature for the Bangla Academy
 Kabir Chowdhury, academic and essayist
 Jibanananda Das (1899–1954), poet
 Indra Das, author in English literature
 Durjoy Datta (1987), author in modern English Literature
 Ashapurna Devi (1909–1995), novelist and short story writer
 Mahasweta Devi (1926–2016), novelist and short story writer
 Nirupama Devi (1883–1951), fiction writer
 Leema Dhar (born 1993), novelist, poet, and columnist
 Chitra Banerjee Divakaruni (born 1956) (born Chitralekha Banerjee), author and poet
 Michael Madhusudan Dutt (1824–1873), poet and dramatist
 Romesh Chunder Dutt (1848–1909), writer and translator of Ramayana and Mahabharata
 Toru Dutt (1856–1877), wrote in English and French
 Himangshu Dutta (1908–1944), composer 
 Sudhindranath Dutta (1901–1960), poet
 Kaberi Gayen (born 1970), author of Muktijuddher Cholochchitre Naree Nirman
 Narayan Gangopadhyay (1918–1970), author, creator of the Tenida character
 Sunil Gangopadhyay (1934–2012), poet and novelist
 Dhirendra Nath Ganguly, director
 Amitav Ghosh (born 1956), novelist and essayist
 Prabir Ghosh (born 1945), writer, essayist, poet and rationalist
 Shankha Ghosh (1932–2021), poet and essayist
 Joy Goswami (born 1954), poet
 Buddhadeb Guha (born 1936), novelist
 Tanika Gupta (born 1963), playwright, appointed Member of the Order of the British Empire in 2008
 Abdul Hakim (1620–1690), medieval poet
 Muhammad Nurul Haque, cultural activist, social worker and writer
 Syed Shamsul Haque, poet and novelist
 Mir Mosharraf Hossain (1847–1912), novelist
 Ashraf Hussain, poet and folklorist
 Hasnat Abdul Hye, writer and novelist
 Muhammed Zafar Iqbal (born 1952), science fiction writer
 Kazi Nazrul Islam (1899–1976), poet
 Jasimuddin (1903–1976), poet, novelist and essayist
 Jīmūtavāhana (c. 12th century), Sanskrit writer of Dāyabhāga
 Dawlat Wazir Bahram Khan, 16th-century poet
 Dilwar Khan, poet known as Gonomanusher Kobi (Poet of the mass people)
 Moniruddin Khan (born 1974), writer and historian
 Muhammad Mojlum Khan, non-fiction English writer best known for The Muslim 100
 Jhumpa Lahiri (born 1967), novelist, short story writer, Pulitzer Prize winner
 Al Mahmud (1936–2019), poet and novelist
 Heyat Mahmud (1693-1760), medieval poet and judge
 Dean Mahomed (1759–1851), first Indian to write a book in the English language
 Binoy Majumdar (1934–2006), poet, Sahitya Akademi Award in 2005
 Kamal Kumar Majumdar (1914–1979), novelist and short story writer
 Leela Majumdar (1908–2007), writer
 R. C. Majumdar, (1888-1980), author, historian
 Samaresh Majumdar (born 1944), writer, creator of the Animesh trilogy
 Dakshinaranjan Mitra Majumder (1877–1956), author
 Reazuddin Ahmad Mashadi (1859–1918), philosopher
 Arun Mitra (1909–2000), poet
 Premendra Mitra (1904–1988), poet and short story writer
 Motiur Rahman Mollik (1950–2010), poet and novelist
 Nurul Momen (1908–1990), playwright
 Bharati Mukherjee (1940–2017), author and educator
 Dhan Gopal Mukerji (1890–1936), author
 Shirshendu Mukhopadhyay (born 1935), novelist
 Subhash Mukhopadhyay (1919–2003), Bengali poet
 Kumud Ranjan Mullick (1883–1970), poet of the Tagore era
 Muhammad Muqim, 18th-century poet
 Ghulam Murshid, writer, essayist and cultural historian
 Shahabuddin Nagari (born 1955), Bangladeshi poet and writer of juvenile fiction
 Naimuddin (1832-1907), Bengali writer and scholar
 Jyotirindranath Nandi, (1912–1982), novelist and short story writer
 Moti Nandi (1931–2010), novelist
 Taslima Nasrin (born 1962), novelist
 Rajat Neogy (1938–1995), poet, writer, thinker and founder of Transition Magazine in Kampala in 1961; Ugandan Indian
 Krittibas Ojha (1381–1461), medieval Bengali poet
 Daulat Qazi (d. 1638), medieval poet
 Rahimunnessa (1763-1800), medieval poet 
 Shamsur Rahman (1929–2006), poet
 M Harunur Rashid, teacher of English and Sufi writer
 Bharatchandra Ray (1712–1760), poet and song composer known for his Mangalkavya
 Dilipkumar Ray (1897–1980), musician, musicologist, novelist, poet and essayist
 Dwijendralal Ray (1863–1913), playwright and poet
 Satyajit Ray (1921–1992), writer and film director
 Annada Shankar Ray (1905–2002), novelist, essayist and poet
 Arundhati Roy (born 1961), novelist and essayist
 Samir Roychoudhury (1933–2016), poet, novelist, short story writer and philosopher
 Shah Muhammad Saghir, 15th-century poet
 Narayan Sanyal (1924–2005), writer of modern Bengali literature
 Subodh Sarkar (born 1958), poet
 Ramprasad Sen (c. 1718 or c. 1723 – c. 1775), Shakta poet of eighteenth century Bengal
 Mallika Sengupta (1960–2011), Bengali poet, feminist, and reader of sociology from Kolkata
 Nares Chandra Sen-Gupta (1882–1964), novelist and legal scholar
 Shankar, (1933), author in English literature
 Hara Prasad Shastri (1853–1931), known as the inventor of Charyapada
 Syed Mustafa Siraj (1930–2012), poet, novelist, short story writer, Sahitya Akademi awardee
 Syed Sultan, wrote the first Prophetic biography in Bengali in the 16th century
 Srijato, won Ananda Puroskar in 2004
 Dwijendranath Tagore  (1840–1926), poet, composer, philosopher, mathematician, painter
 Rabindranath Tagore (1861–1941), poet, composer, novelist, essayist, story-writer, philosopher, painter, educationist
 Ishwar Chandra Vidyasagar (1820–1891), philosopher, educator, writer, translator, publisher, and reformer of the Bengal Renaissance period
 Zainuddin, 15th-century poet
 Dipankar Saha (Deep), (2000) poet, Artist, educationst, writer, singer, philosopher

Cooks 
 Keka Ferdousi
 Alpana Habib
 Nadiya Hussain
 Kiran Jethwa
 Siddika Kabir
 Tony Karim
 Tommy Miah

See also
 List of Bangladeshi people
 List of British Bangladeshis
 List of people from West Bengal

References

Lists of people by ethnicity
Bengal